The history of the United Kingdom began in the early eighteenth century with the Treaty of Union and Acts of Union. The core of the United Kingdom as a unified state came into being in 1707 with the political union of the kingdoms of England and Scotland, into a new unitary state called Great Britain. Of this new state of Great Britain, the historian Simon Schama said:

The Act of Union 1800 added the Kingdom of Ireland to create the United Kingdom of Great Britain and Ireland.

The first decades were marked by Jacobite risings which ended with defeat for the Stuart cause at the Battle of Culloden in 1746. In 1763, victory in the Seven Years' War led to the growth of the First British Empire. With defeat by the United States, France and Spain in the War of American Independence, Great Britain lost its 13 American colonies and rebuilt a Second British Empire based in Asia and Africa. As a result, British culture, and its technological, political, constitutional, and linguistic influence, became worldwide. Politically the central event was the French Revolution and its Napoleonic aftermath from 1793 to 1815, which British elites saw as a profound threat, and worked energetically to form multiple coalitions that finally defeated Napoleon in 1815. The Tories, who came to power in 1783, remained in power (with a short interruption) until 1830. Forces of reform, often emanating from the Evangelical religious elements, opened decades of political reform that broadened the ballot, and opened the economy to free trade. The outstanding political leaders of the 19th century included Palmerston, Disraeli, Gladstone, and Salisbury. Culturally, the Victorian era was a time of prosperity and dominant middle-class virtues when Britain dominated the world economy and maintained a generally peaceful century from 1815 to 1914. The First World War (1914–1918), with Britain in alliance with France, Russia and the United States, was a furious but ultimately successful total war with Germany. The resulting League of Nations was a favourite project in Interwar Britain. However, while the Empire remained strong, as did the London financial markets, the British industrial base began to slip behind Germany and, especially, the United States. Sentiments for peace were so strong that the nation supported appeasement of Hitler's Germany in the late 1930s, until the Nazi invasion of Poland in 1939 started the Second World War. In the Second World War, the Soviet Union and the US joined the UK as the main Allied powers.

Britain was no longer a military or economic superpower, as seen in the Suez Crisis of 1956. Britain no longer had the wealth to maintain an empire, so it granted independence to almost all its possessions. The new states typically joined the Commonwealth of Nations. The postwar years saw great hardships, alleviated somewhat by large-scale financial aid from the United States, and some from Canada. Prosperity returned in the 1950s. Meanwhile, from 1945 to 1950, the Labour Party built a welfare state, nationalized many industries, and created the National Health Service. The UK took a strong stand against Communist expansion after 1945, playing a major role in the Cold War and the formation of NATO as an anti-Soviet military alliance with West Germany, France, the United States, Canada and smaller countries. NATO remains a powerful military coalition. The UK has been a leading member of the United Nations since its founding, as well as numerous other international organizations. In the 1990s, neoliberalism led to the privatisation of nationalised industries and significant deregulation of business affairs. London's status as a world financial hub grew continuously. Since the 1990s, large-scale devolution movements in Northern Ireland, Scotland and Wales have decentralised political decision-making. Britain has moved back and forth on its economic relationships with Western Europe. It joined the European Economic Community in 1973, thereby weakening economic ties with its Commonwealth. However, the Brexit referendum in 2016 committed the UK to leave the European Union, which it did in 2020.

In 1922, 26 counties of Ireland seceded to become the Irish Free State; a day later, Northern Ireland seceded from the Free State and returned to the United Kingdom. In 1927, the United Kingdom changed its formal title to the United Kingdom of Great Britain and Northern Ireland, usually shortened to Britain and (after 1945) to the United Kingdom or UK.

18th century

Birth of the Union

The Kingdom of Great Britain came into being on 1 May 1707, as a result of the political union of the Kingdom of England (which included Wales) and the Kingdom of Scotland under the Treaty of Union. This combined the two kingdoms into a single kingdom and merged the two parliaments into a single parliament of Great Britain. Queen Anne became the first monarch of the new Great Britain. Although now a single kingdom, certain institutions of Scotland and England remained separate, such as Scottish and English law; and the Presbyterian Church of Scotland and the Anglican Church of England. England and Scotland each also continued to have their own system of education.

Meanwhile, the War of the Spanish Succession against France (1701–1714) was underway. It see-sawed back and forth until a more peace-minded government came to power in London and the treaties of Utrecht and Rastadt ended the war. British historian G. M. Trevelyan argues:

Hanoverian kings

The Stuart line died with Anne in 1714, although a die-hard faction with French support supported pretenders. The Elector of Hanover became king as George I. He paid more attention to Hanover and surrounded himself with Germans, making him an unpopular king. He did, however, build up the army and created a more stable political system in Britain and helped bring peace to northern Europe. Jacobite factions seeking a Stuart restoration remained strong; they instigated a revolt in 1715–1716. The son of James II planned to invade England, but before he could do so, John Erskine, Earl of Mar, launched an invasion from Scotland, which was easily defeated.

George II enhanced the stability of the constitutional system, with a government run by Robert Walpole during the period 1730–1742. He built up the First British Empire, strengthening the colonies in the Caribbean and North America. In coalition with the rising power Prussia, the United Kingdom defeated France in the Seven Years' War (1756–1763), and won full control of Canada.

George III never visited Hanover, and spoke English as his first language. Reviled by Americans as a tyrant and the instigator of the American War of Independence, he was insane off and on after 1788, and his eldest son served as regent. He was the last king to dominate government and politics, and his long reign is noted for losing the first British Empire in the American Revolutionary War (1783), as France sought revenge for its defeat in the Seven Years' War by aiding the Americans. The reign was notable for the building of a second empire based in India, Asia and Africa, the beginnings of the industrial revolution that made Britain an economic powerhouse, and above all the life and death struggle with the French, in the French Revolutionary Wars 1793–1802, which ended inconclusively with a short truce, and the epic Napoleonic Wars (1803–1815), which ended with the decisive defeat of Napoleon.

South Sea Bubble
Entrepreneurs gradually extended the range of their business around the globe. The South Sea Bubble was a business enterprise that exploded in scandal. The South Sea Company was a joint-stock company in London. Its ostensible object was to grant trade monopolies in South America; but its actual purpose was to renegotiate previous high-interest government loans amounting to £31 million through market manipulation and speculation. It raised money four times in 1720 by issuing stock, which was purchased by about 8,000 investors. The share price kept soaring every day, from £130 a share to £1,000, with insiders making huge paper profits. The Bubble collapsed overnight, ruining many speculators. Investigations showed bribes had reached into high places—even to the king. Robert Walpole managed to wind it down with minimal political and economic damage, although some losers fled to exile or committed suicide.

Robert Walpole
Robert Walpole is now generally regarded as the first Prime Minister, from, 1719–1742, and indeed he invented the role. The term was applied to him by friends and foes alike by 1727. Historian Clayton Roberts summarizes his new functions:

Moralism, benevolence and hypocrisy

Hypocrisy became a major topic in English political history in the early 18th century. The Toleration Act 1689 allowed for certain rights for religious minorities, but Protestant Nonconformists (such as Congregationalists and Baptists) were still deprived of important rights, such as the right to hold office. Nonconformists who wanted to hold office ostentatiously took the Anglican sacrament once a year in order to avoid the restrictions. High Church Anglicans were outraged. They outlawed what they called "occasional conformity" in 1711 with the Occasional Conformity Act 1711. In the political controversies using sermons, speeches, and pamphlet wars, both high churchmen and Nonconformists attacked their opponents as insincere and hypocritical, as well as dangerously zealous, in contrast to their own moderation. This campaign of moderation versus zealotry peaked in 1709 during the impeachment trial of high church preacher Henry Sacheverell. Historian Mark Knights argues that by its very ferocity, the debate may have led to more temperate and less hypercharged political discourse. "Occasional conformity" was restored by the Whigs when they returned to power in 1719.

English author Bernard Mandeville's famous "Fable of the Bees" (1714) explored the nature of hypocrisy in contemporary European society. On one hand, Mandeville was a "moralist" heir to the French Augustinianism of the previous century, viewing sociability as a mere mask for vanity and pride. On the other, he was a "materialist" who helped found modern economics. He tried to demonstrate the universality of human appetites for corporeal pleasures. He argued that the efforts of self-seeking entrepreneurs are the basis of emerging commercial and industrial society, a line of thought that influenced Adam Smith and 19th-century Utilitarianism. A tension arose between these two approaches concerning the relative power of norms and interests, the relationship between motives and behaviour, and the historical variability of human cultures.

From around 1750 to 1850, Whig aristocrats in England boasted of their special benevolence for the common people. They claimed to be guiding and counselling reform initiatives to prevent the outbreaks of popular discontent that caused instability and revolution across Europe. However Tory and radical critics accused the Whigs of hypocrisy—alleging they were deliberately using the slogans of reform and democracy to boost themselves into power while preserving their precious aristocratic exclusiveness. Historian L.G. Mitchell defends the Whigs, pointing out that thanks to them radicals always had friends at the centre of the political elite, and thus did not feel as marginalised as in most of Europe. He points out that the debates on the 1832 Reform Bill showed that reformers would indeed receive a hearing at parliamentary level with a good chance of success. Meanwhile, a steady stream of observers from the Continent commented on the English political culture. Liberal and radical observers noted the servility of the English lower classes in the early 19th century, the obsession everyone had with rank and title, the extravagance of the aristocracy, and a pervasive hypocrisy that extended into such areas as social reform. There were not so many conservative visitors. They praised the stability of English society, its ancient constitution, and reverence for the past; they ignored the negative effects of industrialisation.

Historians have explored crimes and vices of England's upper classes, especially duelling, suicide, adultery and gambling. They were tolerated by the same courts that executed thousands of poor men and boys for lesser offenses. No aristocrat was punished for killing someone in a duel. However the emerging popular press specialized in sensationalistic stories about upper-class vice, which led the middle classes to focus their critiques on a decadent aristocracy that had much more money, but much less morality than the middle class.

Warfare and finance

From 1700 to 1850, Britain was involved in 137 wars or rebellions. It maintained a relatively large and expensive Royal Navy, along with a small standing army. When the need arose for soldiers it hired mercenaries or financed allies who fielded armies. The rising costs of warfare forced a shift in the sources of government financing, from the income from royal agricultural estates and special imposts and taxes to reliance on customs and excise taxes; and, after 1790, an income tax. Working with bankers in the city, the government raised large loans during wartime and paid them off in peacetime. The rise in taxes amounted to 20% of national income, but the private sector benefited from the increase in economic growth. The demand for war supplies stimulated the industrial sector, particularly naval supplies, munitions and textiles, which gave Britain an advantage in international trade during the postwar years.

The French Revolution polarised British political opinion in the 1790s, with conservatives outraged at the killing of the king, the expulsion of the nobles, and the Reign of Terror. Britain was at war against France almost continuously from 1793 until the final defeat of Napoleon in 1815. Conservatives castigated every radical opinion in Britain as "Jacobin" (in reference to the leaders of the Terror), warning that radicalism threatened an upheaval of British society. The Anti-Jacobin sentiment, well expressed by Edmund Burke and many popular writers was strongest among the landed gentry and the upper classes.

British Empire

The Seven Years' War, which began in 1756, was the first war waged on a global scale, fought in Europe, India, North America, the Caribbean, the Philippines and coastal Africa. Britain was the big winner as it enlarged its empire at the expense of France and others. France lost its role as a colonial power in North America. It ceded New France to Britain, putting a large, traditionalistic French-speaking Catholic element under British control. Spain ceded Florida to Britain, but it only had a few small outposts there. In India, the Carnatic War had left France still in control of its small enclaves but with military restrictions and an obligation to support British client states, effectively leaving the future of India to Britain. The British victory over France in the Seven Years' War therefore left Britain as the world's dominant colonial power.

During the 1760s and 1770s, relations between the Thirteen Colonies and Britain became increasingly strained, primarily because of growing anger against Parliament's repeated attempts to tax American colonists without their consent. The Americans readied their large militias, but were short of gunpowder and artillery. The British assumed falsely that they could easily suppress Patriot resistance. In 1775 the American Revolutionary War began. In 1776 the Patriots expelled all the royal officials and declared the independence of the United States of America. After capturing a British invasion army in 1777, the new nation formed an alliance with France (and in turn Spain aided France), equalizing the military and naval balance and putting Britain at risk of invasion from France. The British army controlled only a handful of coastal cities in the U.S. 1780–1781 was a low point for Britain. Taxes and deficits were high, government corruption was pervasive, and the war in America was entering its sixth year with no apparent end in sight. The Gordon Riots erupted in London during the spring of 1780, in response to increased concessions to Catholics by Parliament. In October 1781 Lord Cornwallis surrendered his army at Yorktown, Virginia. The Treaty of Paris was signed in 1783, formally terminating the war and recognising the independence of the United States. The peace terms were very generous to the new nation, which London hoped correctly would become a major trading partner.

The loss of the Thirteen Colonies, at the time Britain's most populous colonies, marked the transition between the "first" and "second" empires, in which Britain shifted its attention to Asia, the Pacific and later Africa. Adam Smith's Wealth of Nations, published in 1776, had argued that colonies were redundant, and that free trade should replace the old mercantilist policies that had characterised the first period of colonial expansion, dating back to the protectionism of Spain and Portugal. The growth of trade between the newly independent United States and Britain after 1783 confirmed Smith's view that political control was not necessary for economic success.

During its first 100 years of operation, the focus of the British East India Company had been trade, not the building of an empire in India. Company interests turned from trade to territory during the 18th century as the Mughal Empire declined in power and the British East India Company struggled with its French counterpart, the La Compagnie française des Indes orientales, during the Carnatic Wars of the 1740s and 1750s. The British, led by Robert Clive, defeated the French and their Indian allies in the Battle of Plassey, leaving the Company in control of Bengal and a major military and political power in India. In the following decades it gradually increased the size of the territories under its control, either ruling directly or indirectly via local puppet rulers under the threat of force of the Indian Army, 80% of which was composed of native Indian sepoys.

On 22 August 1770, James Cook discovered the eastern coast of Australia while on a scientific voyage to the South Pacific. In 1778, Joseph Banks, Cook's botanist on the voyage, presented evidence to the government on the suitability of Botany Bay for the establishment of a penal settlement, and in 1787 the first shipment of convicts set sail, arriving in 1788.

The British government had somewhat mixed reactions to the outbreak of the French Revolution in 1789, and when war broke out on the Continent in 1792, it initially remained neutral. But the following January, Louis XVI was beheaded. This combined with a threatened invasion of the Netherlands by France spurred Britain to declare war. For the next 23 years, the two nations were at war except for a short period in 1802–1803. Britain alone among the nations of Europe never submitted to or formed an alliance with France. Throughout the 1790s, the British repeatedly defeated the navies of France and its allies, but were unable to perform any significant land operations. An Anglo-Russian invasion of the Netherlands in 1799 accomplished little except the capture of the Dutch fleet.

At the threshold to the 19th century, Britain was challenged again by France under Napoleon, in a struggle that, unlike previous wars, represented a contest of ideologies between the two nations: the constitutional monarchy of Great Britain versus the liberal principles of the French Revolution ostensibly championed by the Napoleonic empire. It was not only Britain's position on the world stage that was threatened: Napoleon threatened invasion of Britain itself, and with it, a fate similar to the countries of continental Europe that his armies had overrun.

1800 to 1837

Union with Ireland

On 1 January 1801, the first day of the 19th century, the Great Britain and Ireland joined to form the United Kingdom of Great Britain and Ireland.

The legislative union of Great Britain and Ireland was brought about by the Act of Union 1800, creating the "United Kingdom of Great Britain and Ireland". The Act was passed in both the Parliament of Great Britain and the Parliament of Ireland, dominated by the Protestant Ascendancy and lacking representation of the country's Catholic population. Substantial majorities were achieved, and according to contemporary documents this was assisted by bribery in the form of the awarding of peerages and honours to opponents to gain their votes.

Under the terms of the merger, the separate Parliaments of Great Britain and Ireland were abolished, and replaced by a united Parliament of the United Kingdom. Ireland thus became an integral part of the United Kingdom, sending around 100 MPs to the House of Commons at Westminster and 28 representative peers to the House of Lords, elected from among their number by the Irish peers themselves, except that Roman Catholic peers were not permitted to take their seats in the Lords. Part of the trade-off for the Irish Catholics was to be the granting of Catholic Emancipation, which had been fiercely resisted by the all-Anglican Irish Parliament. However, this was blocked by King George III, who argued that emancipating the Roman Catholics would breach his Coronation Oath. The Roman Catholic hierarchy had endorsed the Union. However the decision to block Catholic Emancipation fatally undermined the appeal of the Union.

Napoleonic wars

During the War of the Second Coalition (1799–1801), Britain occupied most of the French and Dutch colonies (the Netherlands had been a satellite of France since 1796), but tropical diseases claimed the lives of over 40,000 troops. When the Treaty of Amiens created a pause, Britain was forced to return most of the colonies. In May 1803, war was declared again. Napoleon's plans to invade Britain failed due to the inferiority of his navy, and in 1805, Lord Nelson's fleet decisively defeated the French and Spanish at Trafalgar, which was the last significant naval action of the Napoleonic Wars.

In 1806, Napoleon issued the series of Berlin Decrees, which brought into effect the Continental System. This policy aimed to weaken the British export economy closing French-controlled territory to its trade. Napoleon hoped that isolating Britain from the Continent would end its economic dominance. It never succeeded in its objective. Britain possessed the greatest industrial capacity in Europe, and its mastery of the seas allowed it to build up considerable economic strength through trade to its possessions from its rapidly expanding new Empire. Britain's naval supremacy meant that France could never enjoy the peace necessary to consolidate its control over Europe, and it could threaten neither the home islands nor the main British colonies.

The Spanish uprising in 1808 at last permitted Britain to gain a foothold on the Continent. The Duke of Wellington and his army of British and Portuguese gradually pushed the French out of Spain and in early 1814, as Napoleon was being driven back in the east by the Prussians, Austrians, and Russians, Wellington invaded southern France. After Napoleon's surrender and exile to the island of Elba, peace appeared to have returned, but when he escaped back into France in 1815, the British and their allies had to fight him again. The armies of Wellington and von Blücher defeated Napoleon once and for all at Waterloo.

Financing the war
A key element in British success was its ability to mobilize the nation's industrial and financial resources and apply them to defeating France. With a population of 16 million Britain was barely half the size of France with 30 million. In terms of soldiers the French numerical advantage was offset by British subsidies that paid for a large proportion of the Austrian and Russian soldiers, peaking at about 450,000 in 1813. Most important, the British national output remained strong and the well-organized business sector channeled products into what the military needed. The system of smuggling finished products into the continent undermined French efforts to ruin the British economy by cutting off markets. The British budget in 1814 reached £66 million, including £10 million for the Navy, £40 million for the Army, £10 million for the Allies, and £38 million as interest on the national debt. The national debt soared to £679 million, more than double the GDP. It was willingly supported by hundreds of thousands of investors and tax payers, despite the higher taxes on land and a new income tax. The whole cost of the war came to £831 million. By contrast the French financial system was inadequate and Napoleon's forces had to rely in part on requisitions from conquered lands.

Napoleon also attempted economic warfare against Britain, especially in the Berlin Decree of 1806. It forbade the import of British goods into European countries allied with or dependent upon France, and installed the Continental System in Europe. All connections were to be cut, even the mail. British merchants smuggled in many goods and the Continental System was not a powerful weapon of economic war. There was some damage to Britain, especially in 1808 and 1811, but its control of the oceans helped ameliorate the damage. Even more damage was done to the economies of France and its allies, which lost a useful trading partner. Angry governments gained an incentive to ignore the Continental System, which led to the weakening of Napoleon's coalition.

War of 1812 with United States

Simultaneous with the Napoleonic Wars, trade disputes and British impressment of American sailors led to the War of 1812 with the United States. The "second war of independence" for the American, although in reality it was never the British objective of conquering the former colonies, but of the conquest of the Canadian colonies by the Americans, it was little noticed in Britain, where all attention was focused on the struggle with France. The British could devote few resources to the conflict until the fall of Napoleon in 1814. American frigates also inflicted a series of embarrassing defeats on the British navy, which was short on manpower due to the conflict in Europe. A stepped-up war effort that year brought about some successes such as the burning of Washington, but many influential voices such as the Duke of Wellington argued that an outright victory over the US was impossible.

Peace was agreed to at the end of 1814, but Andrew Jackson, unaware of this, won a great victory over the British at the Battle of New Orleans in January 1815 (news took several weeks to cross the Atlantic before the advent of steam ships). Ratification of the Treaty of Ghent ended the war in February 1815. The major result was the permanent defeat of the Indian allies the British had counted upon. The US-Canada border was demilitarised by both countries, and peaceful trade resumed, although worries of an American conquest of Canada persisted into the 1860s.

Postwar reaction: 1815–1822
The postwar era was a time of economic depression, poor harvests, growing inflation, and high unemployment among returning soldiers. As industrialisation progressed, Britain was more urban and less rural, and power shifted accordingly. The dominant Tory leadership, based in the declining rural sector, was fearful, reactionary and repressive. Tories feared the possible emergence of radicals who might be conspiring to emulate the dreaded French Revolution. In reality the violent radical element was small and weak; there were a handful of small conspiracies involving men with few followers and careless security; they were quickly suppressed. Techniques of repression included the suspension of Habeas Corpus in 1817 (allowing the government to arrest and hold suspects without cause or trial). Sidmouth's Gagging Acts of 1817 heavily muzzled the opposition newspapers; the reformers switched to pamphlets and sold 50,000 a week. In reaction to the Peterloo massacre of 1819, the Liverpool government passed the "Six Acts" in 1819. They prohibited drills and military exercises; facilitated warrants for the search for weapons; outlawed public meetings of more than 50 people, including meetings to organize petitions; put heavy penalties on blasphemous and seditious publications; imposing a fourpenny stamp act on many pamphlets to cut down the flow on news and criticism. Offenders could be harshly punished including exile in Australia. In practice the laws were designed to deter troublemakers and reassure conservatives; they were not often used. By the end of the 1820s, along with a general economic recovery, many of these repressive laws were repealed and in 1828 new legislation guaranteed the civil rights of religious dissenters.

A weak ruler as regent (1811–1820) and king (1820–1830), George IV let his ministers take full charge of government affairs, playing a far lesser role than his father, George III. The principle now became established that the king accepts as prime minister the person who wins a majority in the House of Commons, whether the king personally favours him or not. His governments, with little help from the king, presided over victory in the Napoleonic Wars, negotiated the peace settlement, and attempted to deal with the social and economic malaise that followed. His brother William IV ruled 1830 to 1837, but was little involved in politics. His reign saw several reforms: the poor law was updated, child labour restricted, slavery abolished in nearly all the British Empire, and, most important, the Reform Act 1832 refashioned the British electoral system.

There were no major wars until the Crimean War of 1853–1856. While Prussia, Austria, and Russia, as absolute monarchies, tried to suppress liberalism wherever it might occur, the British came to terms with new ideas. Britain intervened in Portugal in 1826 to defend a constitutional government there and recognising the independence of Spain's American colonies in 1824. British merchants and financiers, and later railway builders, played major roles in the economies of most Latin American nations. The British intervened in 1827 on the side of the Greeks, who had been waging the Greek War of Independence against the Ottoman Empire since 1821.

Whig reforms of the 1830s
The Whig Party recovered its strength and unity by supporting moral reforms, especially the reform of the electoral system, the abolition of slavery and emancipation of the Catholics. Catholic emancipation was secured in the Roman Catholic Relief Act 1829, which removed the most substantial restrictions on Roman Catholics in Britain.

The Whigs became champions of Parliamentary reform. They made Lord Grey prime minister 1830–1834, and the Reform Act 1832 became their signature measure. It broadened the franchise slightly and ended the system of rotten and pocket boroughs (where elections were controlled by powerful families), and gave seats to new industrial centres. The aristocracy continued to dominate the government, the Army and Royal Navy, and high society. After parliamentary investigations demonstrated the horrors of child labour, limited reforms were passed in 1833.

Chartism emerged after the 1832 Reform Bill failed to give the vote to the working class. Activists denounced the 'betrayal' of the working class and the 'sacrificing' of their interests by the 'misconduct' of the government. In 1838, Chartists issued the People's Charter demanding manhood suffrage, equal sized election districts, voting by ballots, payment of MPs (so poor men could serve), annual Parliaments, and abolition of property requirements. Elites saw the movement as pathological, so the Chartists were unable to force serious constitutional debate. Historians see Chartism as both a continuation of the 18th-century fight against corruption and as a new stage in demands for democracy in an industrial society.

In 1832, Parliament abolished slavery in the Empire with the Slavery Abolition Act 1833. The government purchased the slaves for £20,000,000 (the money went to rich plantation owners who mostly lived in England), and freed the slaves, especially those in the Caribbean sugar islands.

Leadership
Prime Ministers of the period included: William Pitt the Younger, Lord Grenville, Duke of Portland, Spencer Perceval, Lord Liverpool, George Canning, Lord Goderich, Duke of Wellington, Lord Grey, Lord Melbourne, and Robert Peel.

Victorian era

Victoria ascended the throne in 1837 at age 18. Her long reign until 1901 saw Britain reach the zenith of its economic and political power. Exciting new technologies such as steam ships, railways, photography, and telegraphs appeared, making the world much faster-paced. Britain again remained mostly inactive in Continental politics, and it was not affected by the wave of revolutions in 1848. The Victorian era saw the fleshing out of the second British Empire. Scholars debate whether the Victorian period—as defined by a variety of sensibilities and political concerns that have come to be associated with the Victorians—actually begins with her coronation or the earlier passage of the Reform Act 1832. The era was preceded by the Georgian era and succeeded by the Edwardian period.

Historians like Bernard Porter have characterized the mid-Victorian era, (1850–1870) as Britain's 'Golden Years.'. There was peace and prosperity, as the national income per person grew by half. Much of the prosperity was due to the increasing industrialization, especially in textiles and machinery, as well as to the worldwide network of trade and engineering that produce profits for British merchants and experts from across the globe. There was peace abroad (apart from the short Crimean war, 1854–1856), and social peace at home. Reforms in industrial conditions were set by Parliament. For example, in 1842, the nation was scandalized by the use of children in coal mines. The Mines Act of 1842 banned employment of girls and boys under ten years old from working underground in coal mines. Opposition to the new order melted away, says Porter. The Chartist movement, peaked as a democratic movement among the working class in 1848; its leaders moved to other pursuits, such as trade unions and cooperative societies. The working class ignored foreign agitators like Karl Marx in their midst, and joined in celebrating the new prosperity. Employers typically were paternalistic, and generally recognized the trade unions. Companies provided their employees with welfare services ranging from housing, schools and churches, to libraries, baths, and gymnasia. Middle-class reformers did their best to assist the working classes aspire to middle-class norms of 'respectability.'

There was a spirit of libertarianism, says Porter, as people felt they were free. Taxes were very low, and government restrictions were minimal. There were still problem areas, such as occasional riots, especially those motivated by anti-Catholicism. Society was still ruled by the aristocracy and the gentry, which controlled high government offices, both houses of Parliament, the church, and the military. Becoming a rich businessman was not as prestigious as inheriting a title and owning a landed estate. Literature was doing well, but the fine arts languished as the Great Exhibition of 1851 showcased Britain's industrial prowess rather than its sculpture, painting or music. The educational system was mediocre; the capstone universities (outside Scotland) were likewise mediocre. Historian Llewellyn Woodward has concluded:

According to historians David Brandon and Alan Brooke, the new system of railways after 1830 brought into being our modern world:

Foreign policy

Free trade imperialism

The Great London Exhibition of 1851 clearly demonstrated Britain's dominance in engineering and industry; that lasted until the rise of the United States and Germany in the 1890s. Using the imperial tools of free trade and financial investment, it exerted major influence on many countries outside Europe, especially in Latin America and Asia. Thus Britain had both a formal Empire based on British rule and an informal one based on the British pound.

Russia, France and the Ottoman Empire

One nagging fear was the possible collapse of the Ottoman Empire. It was well understood that a collapse of that country would set off a scramble for its territory and possibly plunge Britain into war. To head that off Britain sought to keep the Russians from occupying Constantinople and taking over the Bosporous Straits, as well as from threatening India via Afghanistan. In 1853, Britain and France intervened in the Crimean War and defeated Russia at a very high cost in casualties. In the 1870s the Congress of Berlin blocked Russia from imposing the harsh Treaty of San Stefano on the Ottoman Empire. Despite its alliance with the French in the Crimean War, Britain viewed the Second Empire of Napoleon III with some distrust, especially as the emperor constructed ironclad warships and began returning France to a more active foreign policy.

American Civil War

During the American Civil War (1861–1865), British leaders personally disliked American republicanism and favoured the more aristocratic Confederacy, as it had been a major source of cotton for textile mills, but the country never recognized the Confederacy and neither signed a treaty with it. Prince Albert was effective in defusing a war scare in late 1861. The British people, who depended heavily on American food imports, generally favoured the United States. What little cotton was available came from New York, as the blockade by the US Navy shut down 95% of Southern exports to Britain. In September 1862, Britain (along with France) contemplated stepping in and negotiating a peace settlement, which could only mean war with the United States. But in the same month, US president Abraham Lincoln announced the Emancipation Proclamation would be issued in January 1863 making abolition of slavery in the Confederacy a war goal. Since support of the Confederacy now meant support for slavery, there was no longer any possibility of European intervention. However, the British working class were quite overwhelmingly pro-Union. In the end, although Britain could survive without Southern cotton, the North's meat and grain was more important to feed the UK's urban population, especially as a series of bad harvests had affected British agriculture in the late 1850s to early 1860s.

Meanwhile, the British sold arms to both sides, built blockade runners for a lucrative trade with the Confederacy, and surreptitiously allowed warships to be built for the Confederacy. The warships caused a major diplomatic row that was resolved in the Alabama Claims in 1872, in the Americans' favour.

Empire expands
In 1867, Britain united most of its North American colonies as Canada, giving it self-government and responsibility for its internal affairs. Britain handled foreign policy and defence. The second half of the 19th century saw a major expansion of Britain's colonial empire in Asia and Africa as well as the Pacific. In the "Scramble for Africa", the boast was having the Union Jack flying from "Cairo to Cape Town." Britain defended its empire with the world's dominant navy, and a small professional army. It was the only power in Europe to have no conscription.

The rise of the German Empire after 1871 posed a new challenge, for it (along with the United States) threatened to take Britain's place as the world's foremost industrial power. Germany acquired a number of colonies in Africa and the Pacific, but Chancellor Otto von Bismarck succeeded in achieving general peace through his balance of power strategy. When William II became emperor in 1888, he discarded Bismarck, began using bellicose language, and planned to build a navy to rival Britain's.

Boer War

Ever since Britain had taken control of South Africa from the Netherlands in the Napoleonic Wars, it had run afoul of the Dutch settlers who further away and created two republics of their own. The British imperial vision called for control over the new countries and the Dutch-speaking "Boers" (or "Afrikaners") fought back in the War in 1899–1902. British historian Andrew Roberts argues that the Boers insisted on keeping full control of both their two small republics, allowing no role whatever for nonwhites, and distinctly limited roles for British and other European settlers. These "Uitlanders" were the base of the economy, paid 80 percent of the taxes, and had no vote. The Transvaal was in no sense a democracy, argues Roberts, for no black, Britain, Catholic or Jew was allowed to vote or hold any office. Johannesburg was the business centre, with 50,000 primarily British residents, but was not permitted any local government. The English language was banned in official proceedings; no public meetings were permitted; newspapers were closed down arbitrarily; and full citizenship was technically possible but quite rare. Roberts says President Paul Kruger "ran a tight, tough, quasi-police state from his state capital, Pretoria." the British government officially protested; while theoretically recognizing the Transvaal's right to manage its internal affairs, cabinet member Joseph Chamberlain detailed the many ways how Uitlanders were mistreated as second-class non-citizens, despite their essential role in producing prosperity.

The Boer response to the British pressure was to declare war on 20 October 1899. The 410,000 Boers were massively outnumbered, but amazingly they waged a successful guerrilla war, which gave the British regulars a difficult fight. The Boers were landlocked and did not have access to outside help. The weight of numbers, superior equipment, and often brutal tactics eventually brought about a British victory. To defeat the guerrillas, the British rounded up their women and children into concentration camps, where many died of disease. World outrage focused on the camps, led by a large faction of the Liberal Party in Britain. However, the United States gave its support. The Boer republics were merged into Union of South Africa in 1910; it had internal self-government but its foreign policy was controlled by London and was an integral part of the British Empire.

The unexpectedly great difficulty in defeating the Boers forced a reevaluation of British policy. In military terms, it was clear that the Cardwell reforms had been inadequate. The call to establish a general staff to control military operations had been shelved by the Duke of Cambridge, himself a royal with enormous authority. It took a five more years to set up a general staff and other Army reforms, under the administration of Lord Haldane. The Royal Navy was now threatened by Germany. Britain responded by a massive building programme launched in 1904 by the highly controversial First Sea Lord, John Fisher. He launched  in 1906. It was the first modern battleship, based on new armour, new propulsion, new guns and gunnery that made all other warships obsolete.
The Boer War demonstrated that Britain was not loved around the world—it had more enemies than friends and its policy of "splendid isolation" was one of high risk. It needed new friends. It made a military alliance with Japan, and buried old controversies to forge a close relationship with the United States.

Ireland and Home Rule

Part of the agreement which led to the Act of Union 1800 stipulated that the Penal Laws in Ireland were to be repealed and Catholic Emancipation granted. However, King George III blocked emancipation. A campaign under Daniel O'Connell led to the concession of Catholic Emancipation in 1829, allowing Catholics to sit in Parliament.

When potato blight hit Ireland in 1846, much of the rural population was left without food. Relief efforts were inadequate and hundreds of thousands died in the Great Hunger. Millions more migrated to England, or to North America. Ireland became permanently smaller in terms of population

In the 1870s new moderate nationalist movement was formed. As the Irish Parliamentary Party it became a major factor in parliament under Charles Stewart Parnell. Home Rule Bills introduced by Liberal Prime Minister Gladstone failed of passage, and split the Liberals. A significant unionist minority (largely based in Ulster), opposed Home Rule, fearing that a Catholic-Nationalist parliament in Dublin would discriminate against them and would also hurt its industry. Parliament passed laws in 1870, 1881, 1903 and 1909 that enabled most tenant farmers to purchase their lands, and lowered the rents of the others.

Leadership
Historically, the aristocracy was divided between Conservatives and Liberals. However, when Gladstone committed to home rule for Ireland, Britain's upper classes largely abandoned the Liberal party, giving the Conservatives a large permanent majority in the House of Lords. High Society in London, following the Queen, largely ostracized home rulers, and Liberal clubs were badly split. Joseph Chamberlain took a major element of upper-class supporters out of the Party and into a third party, the Liberal Unionists, which collaborated with and eventually merged into the Conservative party. The Gladstonian liberals in 1891 adopted The Newcastle Programme that included home rule for Ireland, disestablishment of the Church of England in Wales and Scotland, tighter controls on the sale of liquor, major extension of factory regulation, and various democratic political reforms. The Programme had a strong appeal to the Nonconformist middle-class Liberal element, which felt liberated by the departure of the aristocracy.

Queen Victoria
Queen Victoria played a small role in politics, but became the iconic symbol of the nation, the empire, and proper, restrained behaviour. Her strength lay in good common sense and directness of character; she expressed the qualities of the British nation which at that time made it preeminent in the world. As a symbol of domesticity, endurance and Empire, and as a woman holding the highest public office during an age when middle- and upper-class women were expected to beautify the home while men dominated the public sphere, Queen Victoria's influence has been enduring. Her success as ruler was due to the power of the self-images she successively portrayed of innocent young woman, devoted wife and mother, suffering and patient widow, and grandmotherly matriarch.

Palmerston
Lord Palmerston dominated foreign policy for decades, through a period when Britain was at the height of its power, serving terms as both Foreign Secretary and Prime Minister. He became controversial at the time, and remains so today, for his aggressive bullying and his "liberal interventionist" policies. He was intensely patriotic; he used the Royal Navy to undermine the Atlantic slave trade.

Disraeli

Disraeli and Gladstone dominated the politics of the late 19th century, Britain's golden age of parliamentary government. They long were idolized, but historians in recent decades have become much more critical, especially regarding Disraeli.

Benjamin Disraeli (prime minister 1868 and 1874–1880) remains an iconic hero of the Conservative Party. He played a central role in the creation of the Party, defining its policies and its broad outreach. Disraeli is remembered for his influential voice in world affairs, his political battles with the Liberal leader William Gladstone, and his one-nation conservatism or "Tory democracy". He made the Conservatives the party most identified with the glory and power of the British Empire. He was born into a Jewish family, which became Episcopalian when he was 12 years old.

Disraeli fought to protect established political, social, and religious values and elites; he emphasized the need for national leadership in response to radicalism, uncertainty, and materialism. He is especially known for his enthusiastic support for expanding and strengthening the British Empire in India and Africa as the foundation of British greatness, in contrast to Gladstone's negative attitude toward imperialism. Gladstone denounced Disraeli's policies of territorial aggrandizement, military pomp, and imperial symbolism (such as making the Queen Empress of India), saying it did not fit a modern commercial and Christian nation.

In foreign policy he is best known for battling and besting Russia. Disraeli's second term was dominated by the Eastern Question—the slow decay of the Ottoman Empire and the desire of Russia to gain at its expense. Disraeli arranged for the British to purchase a major interest in the Suez Canal Company (in Ottoman-controlled Egypt). In 1878, faced with Russian victories against the Ottomans, he worked at the Congress of Berlin to maintain peace in the Balkans and made terms favourable to Britain which weakened Russia, its longstanding enemy.

Disraeli's old reputation as the "Tory democrat" and promoter of the welfare state has faded as historians argue that he had few proposals for social legislation in 1874–1880, and that the 1867 Reform Act did not reflect a vision for the unenfranchised working man. However he did work to reduce class antagonism, for as Perry notes, "When confronted with specific problems, he sought to reduce tension between town and country, landlords and farmers, capital and labour, and warring religious sects in Britain and Ireland—in other words, to create a unifying synthesis."

Gladstone

William Ewart Gladstone was the Liberal counterpart to Disraeli, serving as prime minister four times (1868–1874, 1880–1885, 1886, and 1892–1894). He was the moral compass of the Liberal Party and is famous for his oratory, his religiosity, his liberalism, his rivalry with Disraeli, and for his poor relations with the Queen. Although he personally was not a Nonconformist, and rather disliked them in person, he formed a coalition with the Nonconformists that gave the Liberals a powerful base of support.

Gladstone's first ministry saw many reforms including Disestablishment of the Protestant Church of Ireland and the introduction of secret voting. His party was defeated in 1874, but made a comeback based on opposition to the Ottoman Empire's Bulgarian atrocities against Christians. Gladstone's Midlothian Campaign of 1879–1880 was an pathbreaking introduction of many modern political campaigning techniques. His Liberal party was increasingly pulled apart on the Irish issue. He proposed Irish home rule in 1886; It failed to pass and the resulting split in the Liberal Party kept it out of office for most of the next 20 years.

Gladstone's financial policies, based on the notion of balanced budgets, low taxes and laissez-faire, were suited to a developing capitalist society but could not respond effectively as economic and social conditions changed. Called the "Grand Old Man" later in life, he was always a dynamic popular orator who appealed strongly to British workers and lower middle class. The deeply religious Gladstone brought a new moral tone to politics with his evangelical sensibility and opposition to aristocracy. His moralism often angered his upper-class opponents (including Queen Victoria, who strongly favoured Disraeli), and his heavy-handed control split the Liberal party. His foreign policy goal was to create a European order based on cooperation rather than conflict and mutual trust instead of rivalry and suspicion; the rule of law was to supplant the reign of force and self-interest. This Gladstonian concept of a harmonious Concert of Europe was opposed to and ultimately defeated by the Germans with a Bismarckian system of manipulated alliances and antagonisms.

Regarding Ireland, the major Liberal efforts focused on land reform with the Land Acts, and the disestablishment of the (Anglican) Church of Ireland through the Irish Church Act 1869. Gladstone became a champion of Home Rule, but it caused a deep split in the Liberal Party. Joseph Chamberlain formed the breakaway Liberal Unionist Party that refused to consider Home Rule for Ireland and became allied with the Conservatives.

In terms of historic reforms, Gladstone's first ministry 1868–1874 was his most successful. He was an idealist who insisted that government should take the lead in making society more efficient, more fair, and that the government should expand its role in society in order to extend liberty and toleration. The Education Act of 1870 made universal schooling a major national policy. The justice system was made up of multiple overlapping and conflicting courts dating back centuries. The Judicature Act of 1873 merged them into one central court. In local government the challenges of sanitation and clean water in fast-growing cities were met with new powers in the realm of public health. Local government was streamlined in a later Gladstone ministry, and made more powerful and standardized. Patronage and favouritism were replaced by civil service examinations, downplaying the role of family and aristocracy and emphasizing the role of talent and ability. The secret ballot was enacted in 1872 to prevent the buying of votes—politicians would not pay out the money if they were not sure how the person voted. The Trade Union Act 1871 lessened the intimidation of employers, made unions legal, and protected their funding from lawsuits. The Protestant Church of Ireland was disestablished. Catholics no longer had to pay taxes to it. While the Navy was in fine shape, the Army was not. Its organization was confused, its policies unfair, and its punishments were based chiefly on flogging. At the county level, politicians named the officers of the county militia units, preferring connections in class over capacity. The regular army called for enlistments for 21 years, but with reforms initiated by Edward Cardwell, Gladstone's War Secretary, enlistments were reduced to six years, plus six years in the reserves. Regiments were organized by territorial districts, and advanced with modern rifles. The complex chain of command was simplified, and in wartime the county militias were under the control of the central war office. The purchase of officers' commissions was abolished, as was flogging in peacetime. The reforms were not quite complete, the Duke of Cambridge, as Commander-in-Chief of the Forces, still had great authority, despite his mediocre abilities. Historians have given Gladstone high marks on his successful reform programme.

Salisbury
Historians agree that Lord Salisbury as foreign minister and prime minister in the late 19th century was a strong and effective leader in foreign affairs. He had a superb grasp of the issues, and proved:

Conservative Prime Minister Lord Salisbury was a "talented leader who was an icon of traditional, aristocratic conservatism". Salisbury was "a great foreign minister, [but] essentially negative, indeed reactionary in home affairs". Another historian's estimate is more favourable; he portrays Salisbury as a leader who "held back the popular tide for twenty years." "[I]nto the 'progressive' strain of modern Conservatism he simply will not fit." One historian pointed to "the narrow cynicism of Salisbury". One admirer of Salisbury agrees that Salisbury found the democracy born of the 1867 and 1884 Reform Acts as "perhaps less objectionable than he had expected—succeeding, through his public persona, in mitigating some part of its nastiness."

Early 20th century 1901–1918
Prime Ministers from 1900 to 1945: Marquess of Salisbury, Arthur Balfour, Henry Campbell-Bannerman, H. H. Asquith, David Lloyd George, Bonar Law, Stanley Baldwin, Ramsay MacDonald, Stanley Baldwin, Ramsay MacDonald, Stanley Baldwin, Neville Chamberlain and Winston Churchill.

The Liberal Party was in power from 1906 to 1915, when it formed a wartime coalition. It passed the welfare reforms that created a basic British welfare state. It weakened the veto power of Lords, blocked woman suffrage. In 1914 it apparently "solved" the problem of Irish Home Rule but when the war broke out the solution was shelved. H. H. Asquith was Liberal Prime Minister between 1908 and 1916, followed by David Lloyd George, 1916–1922. Although Asquith was the Party leader, the dominant Liberal was Lloyd George. Asquith was overwhelmed by the wartime role of coalition prime minister, and Lloyd George replaced him as the coalition prime minister in late 1916 but Asquith remained Liberal party leader. The two fought for years over control of the party, badly weakening it in the process. Historian Martin Pugh in The Oxford Companion to British History argues that Lloyd George:

Edwardian era 1901–1914

Queen Victoria died in 1901 and her son Edward VII became king, inaugurating the Edwardian Era, which was characterised by great and ostentatious displays of wealth in contrast to the sombre Victorian Era. With the advent of the 20th century, things such as motion pictures, automobiles, and aeroplanes were coming into use. The new century was characterised by a feeling of great optimism. The social reforms of the last century continued into the 20th with the Labour Party being formed in 1900. Edward died in 1910, to be succeeded by George V, who reigned 1910–1936. Scandal-free, hard working and popular, George V was the British monarch who, with Queen Mary, established the modern pattern of exemplary conduct for British royalty, based on middle-class values and virtues. He understood the overseas Empire better than any of his prime ministers and used his exceptional memory for figures and details, whether of uniforms, politics, or relations, to good effect in reaching out in conversation with his subjects.

The era was prosperous but political crises were escalating out of control. George Dangerfield (1935) identified the "strange death of liberal England" as the multiple crisis that hit simultaneously in 1910–1914 with serious social and political instability arising from the Irish crisis, labour unrest, the women's suffrage movements, and partisan and constitutional struggles in Parliament. At one point it even seemed the Army might refuse orders dealing with Northern Ireland. No solution appeared in sight when the unexpected outbreak of the Great War in 1914 put domestic issues on hold.

Ross McKibbin argues that the political party system of the Edwardian era was in delicate balance on the eve of the war in 1914. The Liberals were in power with a progressive alliance of Labour and, off and on, Irish Nationalists. The coalition was committed to free trade (as opposed to the high tariffs the Conservatives sought), free collective bargaining for trades unions (which Conservatives opposed), an active social policy that was forging the welfare state, and constitutional reform to reduce the power of the House of Lords. The coalition lacked a long-term plan, because it was cobbled together from leftovers from the 1890s. The sociological basis was non-Anglican religion and non-English ethnicity rather than the emerging class conflict emphasized by Labour.

First World War

On 4 August, the King declared war on Germany and Austria, following the advice of Prime Minister H. H. Asquith of the Liberal Party. The rest of the Empire automatically followed. The cabinet's basic reasons for declaring war focused on a deep commitment to France and avoidance of splitting the Liberal Party. Top Liberals led by Asquith and Foreign Secretary Edward Grey threatened to resign if the cabinet refused to support France. That would deeply split the party and mean loss of control of the government to a coalition or to the Unionist (i.e. Conservative) opposition. However, the large antiwar element among Liberals, with David Lloyd George as spokesperson, would support the war to honour the 1839 treaty that guaranteed Belgian neutrality. So Belgium rather than France was the public reason given. Posters took the line that Britain was required to go to war to safeguard Belgium's neutrality under the 1839 Treaty of London.

Britain actually entered the war to support France, which had entered to support Russia, which in turn had entered to support Serbia. Britain became part of the Triple Entente with France and Russia, which (with smaller allies) fought the Central Powers of Germany, Austria and the Ottoman Empire. After a few weeks the Western Front turned into a killing ground in which millions of men died but no army made a large advance. The main British contribution was financial—loans and grants helped Russia, Italy and smaller allies afford the war.

The stalemate required an endless supply of men and munitions. By 1916, volunteering fell off, the government imposed conscription in Britain (but not in Ireland) to keep up the strength of the Army. With his slow start and mobilization of national resources, H. H. Asquith had proven inadequate: he was more of a committee chairman, and he started to drink so heavily after midday that only his morning hours were effective. Asquith was replaced in December 1916 with the much more effective David Lloyd George. He had strong support from Unionists and considerable backing of Labour, as well as a majority of his own Liberal Party, although Asquith turned hostile. Lloyd George answered the loud demands for a much more decisive government by setting up a new small war cabinet, a cabinet secretariat under Maurice Hankey, and a secretariat of private advisors in the 'Garden Suburb'; he moved towards prime ministerial control.

Britain eagerly supported the war, but Irish Nationalist opinion was divided: some served in the British Army, but the Irish Republican Brotherhood plotted an Easter Rebellion in 1916. It quickly failed but the brutal repression that followed turned that element against Britain, as did failed British plans to introduce conscription in Ireland in 1917.

The nation now successfully mobilised its manpower, womanpower, industry, finances, Empire and diplomacy, in league with France and the U.S. to defeat the enemy. The British Army had traditionally never been a large employer in the nation, with the regular army standing at 250,000 at the start of the war. By 1918, there were about five million people in the army and the fledgling Royal Air Force, newly formed from the Royal Naval Air Service (RNAS) and the Royal Flying Corps (RFC), was about the same size of the pre-war army. The economy grew about 14% from 1914 to 1918 despite the absence of so many men in the services; by contrast the German economy shrank 27%. The War saw a decline of civilian consumption, with a major reallocation to munitions. The government share of GDP soared from 8% in 1913 to 38% in 1918 (compared to 50% in 1943). The war forced Britain to use up its financial reserves and borrow large sums from New York banks. After the U.S. entered in April 1917, the Treasury borrowed directly from the U.S. government.

The Royal Navy dominated the seas, defeating the smaller German fleet in the only major naval battle of the war, the Battle of Jutland in 1916. Germany was blockaded, leading to an increasing shortage of food. Germany's naval strategy increasingly turned towards use of U-boats to strike back against the British, despite the risk of triggering war with the powerful neutral power, the United States. Berlin declared the water routes to Britain were war zones where any ship, neutral or otherwise, was a target. Nevertheless, international route law required giving the crew and passengers an opportunity to get into their lifeboats. In May 1915, a U-boat, without warning, torpedoed the British passenger liner Lusitania; it sank in 18 minutes, drowning over 1000 helpless civilians including over 100 Americans. Vigorous protests by American President Woodrow Wilson forced Berlin to abandon unrestricted submarine warfare. With victory over Russia in 1917, the German high command now calculated it could finally have numerical superiority on the Western Front. Planning for a massive spring offensive in 1918, it resumed the sinking of all merchant ships without warning, even if they were flying the American flag. The US entered the war alongside the Allies (without officially joining them), and provided the needed money and supplies to sustain the Allies' war efforts. The U-boat threat was ultimately defeated by a convoy system across the Atlantic.

On other fronts, the British, French, New Zealanders, Australians, and Japanese seized Germany's colonies. Britain fought the Ottoman Empire, suffering defeats in the Gallipoli Campaign and in Mesopotamia (Iraq), while arousing the Arabs who helped expel the Turks from their lands. Exhaustion and war-weariness were growing worse in 1917, as the fighting in France continued with no end in sight. After defeating Russia, the Germans tried to win in the spring of 1918 before the millions of American soldiers arrived. They failed, and they were overwhelmed by August and finally accepted an Armistice on 11 November 1918, that amounted to a surrender

British society and government were radically transformed by the repeated calls for manpower, the employment of women, the dramatic increase in industrial production and munitions, price controls and rationing, and the wide and deep emotional patriotism dedicated to winning the war. Parliament took a backseat, as new departments bureaus committees and operations were created every week, experts were consulted, and the prime minister's Orders in Council replaced the slow legislative process. Even after peace arrived, the new size and dynamism had permanently transformed the effectiveness of British government. David Lloyd George, also a Liberal, was the high-powered Minister of Munitions who replaced Asquith in late 1916. He gave energy and dynamism to the war effort with his remarkable ability to convince people to do what he wanted and thus get ideas put into actual useful high-speed motion. His top aide Winston Churchill said of Lloyd George: "He was the greatest master of the art of getting things done and of putting things through that I ever knew; in fact no British politician my day has possessed half his competence as a mover of men and affairs."

Victorian attitudes and ideals that had continued into the first years of the 20th century changed during the First World War. The almost three million casualties were known as the "Lost Generation", and such numbers inevitably left society scarred. The lost generation felt its sacrifice was little regarded in Britain, with poems like Siegfried Sassoon's Blighters criticising the ill-informed jingoism of the home front. The lost generation was politically inert, and never had its chance to make a generational change in political power. The young men who governed Britain in 1914 were the same old men who governed Britain in 1939.

Postwar settlement
The war had been won by Britain and its allies, but at a terrible human and financial cost, creating a sentiment that wars should never be fought again. The League of Nations was founded with the idea that nations could resolve their differences peacefully, but these hopes were unfulfilled. The harsh peace settlement imposed on Germany would leave it embittered and seeking revenge.

At the Paris Peace Conference of 1919, Lloyd George, American President Woodrow Wilson and French premier Georges Clemenceau made all the major decisions. They formed the League of Nations as a mechanism to prevent future wars. They sliced up the losers to form new nations in Europe, and divided up the German colonies and Ottoman holdings outside Turkey. They imposed what appeared to be heavy financial reparations (but in the event were of modest size). They humiliated Germany by forcing it to declare its guilt for starting the war, a policy that caused deep resentment in Germany and helped fuel reactions such as Nazism. Britain gained the German colony of Tanganyika and part of Togoland in Africa, while its dominions added other colonies. Britain gained League of Nations mandates over Palestine, which had been partly promised as a homeland for Jewish settlers, and Iraq. Iraq became fully independent in 1932. Egypt, which had been a British protectorate since 1882, became independent in 1922, although the British remained there until 1952.

Irish independence and partition

In 1912 the House of Commons passed a new Home Rule bill. Under the Parliament Act 1911 the House of Lords retained the power to delay legislation by up to two years, so it was eventually enacted as the Government of Ireland Act 1914, but suspended for the duration of the war. Civil war threatened when the Protestant-Unionists of Northern Ireland refused to be placed under Catholic-Nationalist control. Semi-military units were formed ready to fight—the Unionist Ulster Volunteers opposed to the Act and their Nationalist counterparts, the Irish Volunteers supporting the Act. The outbreak of the World War in 1914 put the crisis on political hold. A disorganized Easter Rising in 1916 was brutally suppressed by the British, which had the effect of galvanizing Nationalist demands for independence. Prime Minister Lloyd George failed to introduce Home Rule in 1918 and in the December 1918 General Election Sinn Féin won a majority of Irish seats. Its MPs refused to take their seats at Westminster, instead choosing to sit in the First Dáil parliament in Dublin. A declaration of independence was ratified by Dáil Éireann, the self-declared Republic's parliament in January 1919. An Anglo-Irish War was fought between Crown forces and the Irish Republican Army between January 1919 and June 1921. The war ended with the Anglo-Irish Treaty of December 1921 that established the Irish Free State. Six northern, predominantly Protestant counties became Northern Ireland and have remained part of the United Kingdom ever since, despite demands of the Catholic minority to unite with the Republic of Ireland. Britain officially adopted the name "United Kingdom of Great Britain and Northern Ireland" by the Royal and Parliamentary Titles Act 1927.

Interwar era 1918–1939

Historian Arthur Marwick sees a radical transformation of British society resulting from the Great War, a deluge that swept away many old attitudes and brought in a more equalitarian society. He sees the famous literary pessimism of the 1920s as misplaced, arguing there were major positive long-term consequences of the war to British society. He points to an energized self-consciousness among workers that quickly built up the Labour Party, the coming of partial woman suffrage, and an acceleration of social reform and state control of the economy. He sees a decline of deference toward the aristocracy and established authority in general, and the weakening among youth of traditional restraints on individual moral behavior. The chaperone faded away; village druggists sold contraceptives. Marwick says that class distinctions softened, national cohesion increased, and British society became more equal.

Popular culture
As a leisure, literacy, wealth, ease of travel, and a broadened sense of community grew in Britain from the late 19th century onward, there was more time and interest in leisure activities of all sorts, on the part of all classes. The annual vacation became common. Tourists flocked to seaside resorts; Blackpool hosted 7 million visitors a year in the 1930s. Organized leisure was primarily a male activity, with middle-class women allowed in at the margins. There were class differences with upper-class clubs, and working-class and middle-class pubs. Heavy drinking declined; there were more competitions that attracted heavy betting. Participation in sports and all sorts of leisure activities increased for the average Englishman, and his interest in spectator sports increased dramatically. By the 1920s the cinema and radio attracted all classes, ages and genders in very large numbers, with young women taking the lead. Working-class men wearing flat caps and eating fish and chips were boisterous football spectators. They sang along at the music hall, fancied their pigeons, gambled on horse racing, and took the family to Blackpool in summer. The cartoon realization of this life style Andy Capp began in 1957. Political activists complained that working-class leisure diverted men away from revolutionary agitation.

Cinema and radio

The British film industry emerged in the 1890s when cinemas in general broke through in the western world, and built heavily on the strong reputation of the London legitimate theatre for actors, directors and producers. The problem was that the American market was so much larger and richer. It bought up the top talent, especially when Hollywood came to the fore in the 1920s and produced over 80 percent of the total world output. Efforts to fight back were futile—the government set a quota for British made films, but it failed. Hollywood furthermore dominated the lucrative Canadian and Australian markets. Bollywood (based in Bombay) dominated the huge Indian market. The most prominent directors remaining in London were Alexander Korda, an expatriate Hungarian, and Alfred Hitchcock. There was a revival of creativity in the 1933–1945 era, especially with the arrival of Jewish filmmakers and actors fleeing the Nazis. Meanwhile, giant palaces were built for the huge audiences that wanted to see Hollywood films. In Liverpool 40 percent of the population attended one of the 69 cinemas once a week; 25 percent went twice. Traditionalists grumbled about the American cultural invasion, but the permanent impact was minor.

In radio, British audiences had no choice apart from the upscale programming of the BBC, a government agency which had a monopoly on broadcasting. John Reith, an intensely moralistic engineer, was in full charge. His goal was to broadcast, "All that is best in every department of human knowledge, endeavour and achievement.... The preservation of a high moral tone is obviously of paramount importance."

Sports

The British showed a more profound interest in sports, and in greater variety, than any rival. They gave pride of place to such moral issues as sportsmanship and fair play. Football proved highly attractive to the urban working classes, which introduced the rowdy spectator to the sports world. New games became popular almost overnight, including golf, lawn tennis, cycling and hockey. Women were much more likely to enter these sports than the old established ones. The aristocracy and landed gentry, with their ironclad control over land rights, dominated hunting, shooting, fishing and horse racing. Cricket reflected the Imperial spirit throughout the Empire (except Canada). Test matches began by the 1870s; the most famous are those between Australia and England for The Ashes.

Reading
As literacy and leisure time expanded after 1900, reading became a popular pastime. New additions to adult fiction doubled during the 1920s, reaching 2800 new books a year by 1935. Libraries tripled their stock, and saw heavy demand for new fiction. A dramatic innovation was the inexpensive paperback, pioneered by Allen Lane at Penguin Books in 1935. The first titles included novels by Ernest Hemingway and Agatha Christie. They were sold cheap (usually sixpence) in a wide variety of inexpensive stores such as Woolworth's. Penguin aimed at an educated middle class "middlebrow" audience. It avoided the downmarket image of American paperbacks. The line signalled cultural self-improvement and political education. However the war years caused a shortage of staff for publishers and book stores, and a severe shortage of rationed paper, worsened by the air raid on Paternoster Square in 1940 that burned 5 million books in warehouses.

Romantic fiction was especially popular, with Mills and Boon the leading publisher. Romantic encounters were embodied in a principle of sexual purity that demonstrated not only social conservatism, but also how heroines could control their personal autonomy. Adventure magazines became quite popular, especially those published by DC Thomson; the publisher sent observers around the country to talk to boys and learn what they wanted to read about. The story line in magazines and cinema that most appealed to boys was the glamorous heroism of British soldiers fighting wars that were exciting and just.

Politics and economics of the 1920s

Expanding the welfare state
Two major programmes that permanently expanded the welfare state passed in 1919 and 1920 with surprisingly little debate, even as the Conservatives dominated parliament. The Housing, Town Planning, &c. Act 1919 set up a system of government housing that followed the 1918 campaign promises of "homes fit for heroes." This "Addison Act", named after the first Minister of Health, Christopher Addison, required local authorities to survey their housing needs and start building houses to replace slums. The Treasury subsidized the low rents. In England and Wales 214,000 houses were built, and the Ministry of Health became largely a ministry of housing.

The Unemployment Insurance Act 1920 passed at a time of very little unemployment. It set up the dole system that provided 39 weeks of unemployment benefits to practically the entire civilian working population except domestic service, farm workers, and civil servants. Funded in part by weekly contributions from both employers and employed, it provided weekly payments of 15s for unemployed men and 12s for unemployed women. Historian Charles Mowat calls these two laws "Socialism by the back door", and notes how surprised politicians were when the costs to the Treasury soared during the high unemployment of 1921.

Conservative control
The Lloyd George ministry fell apart in 1922. Stanley Baldwin, as leader of the Conservative Party (1923–1937) and as Prime Minister (in 1923–1924, 1924–1929 and 1935–1937), dominated British politics. His mixture of strong social reforms and steady government proved a powerful election combination, with the result that the Conservatives governed Britain either by themselves or as the leading component of the National Government. He was the last party leader to win over 50% of the vote (in the general election of 1931). Baldwin's political strategy was to polarize the electorate so that voters would choose between the Conservatives on the right and the Labour Party on the left, squeezing out the Liberals in the middle. The polarization did take place and while the Liberals remained active under Lloyd George, they won few seats and were a minor factor until they joined a coalition with the Conservatives in 2010. Baldwin's reputation soared in the 1920s and 1930s, but crashed after 1945 as he was blamed for the appeasement policies toward Germany, and as admirers of Churchill made him the Conservative icon. Since the 1970s Baldwin's reputation has recovered somewhat.

Labour won the 1923 election, but in 1924 Baldwin and the Conservatives returned with a large majority.

McKibbin finds that the political culture of the interwar period was built around an anti-socialist middle class, supported by the Conservative leaders, especially Baldwin.

Economics
Taxes rose sharply during the war and never returned to their old levels. A rich man paid 8% of his income in taxes before the war, and about a third afterwards. Much of the money went for the dole, the weekly unemployment benefits. About 5% of the national income every year was transferred from the rich to the poor. A. J. P. Taylor argues most people "were enjoying a richer life than any previously known in the history of the world: longer holidays, shorter hours, higher real wages."

The British economy was lackluster in the 1920s, with sharp declines and high unemployment in heavy industry and coal, especially in Scotland and Wales. Exports of coal and steel fell in half by 1939 and the business community was slow to adopt the new labour and management principles coming from the US, such as Fordism, consumer credit, eliminating surplus capacity, designing a more structured management, and using greater economies of scale. For over a century the shipping industry had dominated world trade, but it remained in the doldrums despite various stimulus efforts by the government. With the very sharp decline in world trade after 1929, its condition became critical.

Chancellor of the Exchequer Winston Churchill put Britain back on the gold standard in 1925, which many economists blame for the mediocre performance of the economy. Others point to a variety of factors, including the inflationary effects of the World War and supply-side shocks caused by reduced working hours after the war.

By the late 1920s, economic performance had stabilised, but the overall situation was disappointing, for Britain had fallen behind the United States as the leading industrial power. There also remained a strong economic divide between the north and south of England during this period, with the south of England and the Midlands fairly prosperous by the Thirties, while parts of south Wales and the industrial north of England became known as "distressed areas" due to particularly high rates of unemployment and poverty. Despite this, the standard of living continued to improve as local councils built new houses to let to families rehoused from outdated slums, with up to date facilities including indoor toilets, bathrooms and electric lighting now being included in the new properties. The private sector enjoyed a housebuilding boom during the 1930s.

Labour
During the war, trade unions were encouraged and their membership grew from 4.1 million in 1914 to 6.5 million in 1918. They peaked at 8.3 million in 1920 before relapsing to 5.4 million in 1923.

Coal was a sick industry; the best seams were being exhausted, raising the cost. Demand fell as oil began replacing coal for fuel. The 1926 general strike was a nine-day nationwide walkout of 1.3 million railwaymen, transport workers, printers, dockers, iron workers and steelworkers supporting the 1.2 million coal miners who had been locked out by the owners. The miners had rejected the owners' demands for longer hours and reduced pay in the face of falling prices. The Conservative government had provided a nine-month subsidy in 1925 but that was not enough to turn around a sick industry. To support the miners the Trades Union Congress (TUC), an umbrella organization of all trades unions, called out certain critical unions. The hope was the government would intervene to reorganize and rationalize the industry, and raise the subsidy. The Conservative government had stockpiled supplies and essential services continued with middle class volunteers. All three major parties opposed the strike. The Labour Party leaders did not approve and feared it would tar the party with the image of radicalism, for the Comintern in Moscow had sent instructions for Communists to aggressively promote the strike. The general strike itself was largely non-violent, but the miners' lockout continued and there was violence in Scotland. It was the only general strike in British history, for TUC leaders such as Ernest Bevin considered it a mistake . Most historians treat it as a singular event with few long-term consequences, but Martin Pugh says it accelerated the movement of working-class voters to the Labour Party, which led to future gains. The Trade Disputes and Trade Unions Act 1927 made general strikes illegal and ended the automatic payment of union members to the Labour Party. That act was largely repealed in 1946. The coal industry used up the more accessible coal and as costs rose output fell from 2567 million tons in 1924 to 183 million in 1945. The Labour government nationalised the mines in 1947.

Great Depression

The Great Depression originated in the United States in late 1929 and quickly spread to the world. Britain had never experienced the boom that had characterized the US, Germany, Canada and Australia in the 1920s, so its bust appeared less severe. Britain's world trade fell in half (1929–1933), the output of heavy industry fell by a third, employment profits plunged in nearly all sectors. At the depth in summer 1932, registered unemployed numbered 3.5 million, and many more had only part-time employment. Experts tried to remain optimistic. John Maynard Keynes, who had not predicted the slump, said, "'There will be no serious direct consequences in London. We find the look ahead decidedly encouraging."

On the left figures such as Sidney and Beatrice Webb, J. A. Hobson, and G. D. H. Cole repeated the warnings they had been making for years about the imminent death of capitalism, only now far more people paid attention. Starting in 1935 the Left Book Club provided a new warning every month, and built up the credibility of Soviet-style socialism as an alternative.

Particularly hardest hit by economic problems were the north of England, Scotland, Northern Ireland and Wales; unemployment reached 70% in some areas at the start of the 1930s (with more than 3 million out of work nationally) and many families depended entirely on the dole.

In 1936, by which time unemployment was lower, 200 unemployed men made a highly publicized march from Jarrow to London in a bid to show the plight of the industrial poor. Although much romanticized by the Left, the Jarrow Crusade marked a deep split in the Labour Party and resulted in no government action. Unemployment remained high until the war absorbed all the job seekers. George Orwell's book The Road to Wigan Pier gives a bleak overview of the hardships of the time.

Appeasement

Vivid memories of the horrors and deaths of the World War made Britain and its leaders strongly inclined to pacifism in the interwar era. The challenge came from dictators, first Benito Mussolini of Italy, then Adolf Hitler of a much more powerful Nazi Germany. The League of Nations proved disappointing to its supporters; it was unable to resolve any of the threats posed by the dictators. British policy was to "appease" them in the hopes they would be satiated. By 1938 it was clear that war was looming, and that Germany had the world's most powerful military. The final act of appeasement came when Britain and France sacrificed Czechoslovakia to Hitler's demands at the Munich Agreement of 1938. Instead of satiation Hitler menaced Poland, and at last Prime Minister Neville Chamberlain dropped appeasement and stood firm in promising to defend Poland. Hitler however cut a deal with Joseph Stalin to divide Eastern Europe; when Germany did invade Poland in September 1939, Britain and France declared war; the British Commonwealth followed London's lead.

Second World War 1939–1945

The King declared war on Nazi Germany in September 1939, after the German invasion of Poland. During the quiet period of "phoney war", the British sent to France the most highly mechanized army in the world; together with France they had more tanks than Germany, but fewer warplanes. The smashing German victory in Spring 1940 was due entirely to "superior combat doctrine. Realistic training, imaginative battlefield leadership, and unparalleled initiative from generals down to sergeants." The British with the thinnest of margins rescued its main army from Dunkirk (as well as many French soldiers), leaving all their equipment and war supplies behind. Winston Churchill came to power, promising to fight the Germans to the very end. The Germans threatened an invasion—which the Royal Navy was prepared to repel. First the Germans tried to achieve air supremacy but were defeated by the Royal Air Force in the Battle of Britain in late summer 1940. Japan declared war in December 1941, and quickly seized Hong Kong, Malaya, Singapore, and Burma, and threatened Australia and India. Britain formed an alliance with the Soviet Union (starting in 1941) and very close ties to the United States (starting in 1940). The war was very expensive. It was paid for by high taxes, by selling off assets, and by accepting large amounts of Lend Lease from the U.S. and Canada. The US gave $30 billion in munitions; Canada also gave aid. (The American and Canadian aid did not have to be repaid, but there were also American loans that were repaid.)

Britain's total mobilisation during this period proved to be successful in winning the war, by maintaining strong support from public opinion. The war was a "people's war" that enlarged democratic aspirations and produced promises of a postwar welfare state.

The media called it a "people's war"—a term that caught on and signified the popular demand for planning and an expanded welfare state. The Royal family played major symbolic roles in the war. They refused to leave London during the Blitz and were indefatigable in visiting troops, munition factories, dockyards, and hospitals all over the country. All social classes appreciated how the royals shared the hopes, fears and hardships of the people.

Mobilisation of women

Historians credit Britain with a highly successful record of mobilising the home front for the war effort, in terms of mobilising the greatest proportion of potential workers, maximising output, assigning the right skills to the right task, and maintaining the morale and spirit of the people.

Much of this success was due to the systematic planned mobilisation of women, as workers, soldiers and housewives, enforced after December 1941 by conscription. Women supported the war effort, and made the rationing of consumer goods a success. In some ways the government over-responded, evacuating too many children in the first days of the war, closing cinemas as frivolous then reopening them when the need for cheap entertainment became clear, sacrificing cats and dogs to save a little space on shipping pet food, only to discover an urgent need to keep rats and mice under control.

The British relied successfully on voluntarism. Munitions production rose dramatically, and the quality remained high. Food production was emphasised, in large part to free shipping for munitions. Farmers increased the area under cultivation from 12,000,000 to 18,000,000 acres (from about 50,000 to 75,000 km2), and the farm labour force was expanded by a fifth, thanks especially to the Women's Land Army.

Welfare state

The success of the government in providing new services, such as hospitals and school lunches, as well as egalitarian spirit, contributed to widespread support for an enlarged welfare state. It was supported by the coalition government and all major parties. Welfare conditions, especially regarding food, improved during the war as the government imposed rationing and subsidized food prices. Conditions for housing, however, worsened with the bombing, and clothing was in short supply.

Equality increased dramatically, as incomes declined sharply for the wealthy and for white collar workers, as their taxes soared, while blue collar workers benefited from rationing and price controls.

People demanded an expansion of the welfare state as a reward to the people for their wartime sacrifices The goal was operationalized in a famous report by William Beveridge. It recommended that the various income maintenance services that had grown-up piecemeal since 1911 be systematized and made universal. Unemployment benefits and sickness benefits were to be universal. There would be new benefits for maternity. The old-age pension system would be revised and expanded, and require that a person retired. A full-scale National Health Service would provide free medical care for everyone. All the major parties endorsed the principles and they were largely put into effect when peace returned.

Postwar

Britain had won the war, but it lost India in 1947 and nearly all the rest of the Empire by the 1960s. It debated its role in world affairs and joined the United Nations in 1945, NATO in 1949, and became a close ally of the United States. Prosperity returned in the 1950s, and London remained a world centre of finance and culture, but the nation was no longer a major world power. In 1973, after a long debate and initial rejection, it joined the Common Market.

Austerity, 1945–1950
The end of the war saw a landslide victory for Clement Attlee and the Labour Party. They were elected on a manifesto of greater social justice with left-wing policies such as the creation of a National Health Service, more council housing and nationalisation of several major industries. Britain faced a severe financial crisis, and responded by reducing her international responsibilities and by sharing the hardships of an "age of austerity". Large loans from the United States and Marshall Plan grants helped rebuild and modernise its infrastructure and business practices. Rationing and conscription dragged on well into the post war years, and the country suffered one of the worst winters on record. Nevertheless, morale was boosted by events such as the marriage of Princess Elizabeth in 1947 and the Festival of Britain in 1951.

Nationalisation
Labour Party experts went into the files to find the detailed plans for nationalisation. To their surprise, there were no plans. The leaders decided to act fast to keep up the momentum of the 1945 electoral landslide. They started with the Bank of England, civil aviation, coal, and Cable & Wireless. Then came railways, canals, road haulage and trucking, electricity, and gas. Finally came iron and steel, which was a special case because it was a manufacturing industry. Altogether, about one fifth of the economy was nationalised. Labour dropped its plans to nationalise farmlands. The procedure used was developed by Herbert Morrison, who as Lord President of the Council chaired the Committee on the Socialization of Industries. He followed the model that had already been used to establish public corporations such as the BBC (1927). In exchange for the shares, the owners of the companies were given government bonds paying low rates of interest, and the government took full ownership of each affected company, consolidating it into a national monopoly. The management remained the same, but they were now effectively civil servants working for the government.

For the Labour Party leadership, nationalisation was a way to consolidate economic planning in their own hands. It was not designed to modernise old industries, make them efficient, or transform their organisational structure. There was no money for modernisation, although the Marshall Plan, operated separately by American planners, did force many British businesses to adopt modern managerial techniques. Hardline socialists were disappointed, as the nationalised industries seemed identical to the old private corporations, and national planning was made virtually impossible by the government's financial constraints. Socialism was in place, but it did not seem to make a major difference. Rank-and-file workers had long been motivated to support Labour by tales of the mistreatment of workers by foremen and the management. The foremen and the managers were the same people as before, with much the same power over the workplace. There was no worker control of industry. The unions resisted government efforts to set wages. By the time of the general elections in 1950 and 1951, Labour seldom boasted about nationalisation of industry. Instead it was the Conservatives who decried the inefficiency and mismanagement, and promised to reverse the takeover of steel and trucking.

Prosperity of the postwar years
As the country headed into the 1950s, rebuilding continued and a number of immigrants from the remaining British Empire, mostly the Caribbean and the Indian subcontinent, were invited to help the rebuilding effort. As the 1950s wore on, Britain lost its place as a superpower and could no longer maintain its large Empire. This led to decolonisation, and a withdrawal from almost all of its colonies by 1970. Events such as the Suez Crisis showed that the UK's status had fallen in the world. The 1950s and 1960s were, however, relatively prosperous times after the Second World War, and saw the beginning of a modernisation of the UK, with the construction of its first motorways for example, and also during the 1960s a great cultural movement began which expanded across the world. Unemployment was relatively low during this period and the standard of living continued to rise with more new private and council housing developments taking place and the number of slum properties diminishing.

The postwar period also witnessed a dramatic rise in the average standard of living, as characterised by a 40% rise in average real wages from 1950 to 1965. Earnings for men in industry rose by 95% between 1951 and 1964, while during that same period the official workweek was reduced and five reductions in income tax were made. Those in traditionally poorly paid semi-skilled and unskilled occupations saw a particularly marked improvement in their wages and living standards. As summed up by R. J. Unstead,

In 1950, the UK standard of living was higher than in any EEC country apart from Belgium. It was 50% higher than the West German standard of living, and twice as high as the Italian standard of living. By the earlier Seventies, however, the UK standard of living was lower than all EEC countries apart from Italy (which, according to one calculation, was roughly equal to Britain). In 1951, the average weekly earnings of men over the age of 21 stood at £8 6s 0d, and nearly doubled a decade later to £15 7s 0d. By 1966, average weekly earnings stood at £20 6s 0d. Between 1964 and 1968, the percentage of households with a television set rose from 80.5% to 85.5%, a washing machine from 54% to 63%, a refrigerator from 35% to 55%, a car from 38% to 49%, a telephone from 21.5% to 28%, and central heating from 13% to 23%.

Between 1951 and 1963, wages rose by 72% while prices rose by 45%, enabling people to afford more consumer goods than ever before. Between 1955 and 1967, the average earnings of weekly-paid workers increased by 96% and those of salaried workers by 95%, while prices rose by about 45% in the same period. The rising affluence of the Fifties and Sixties was underpinned by sustained full employment and a dramatic rise in workers' wages. In 1950, the average weekly wage stood at £6.8s, compared with £11.2s.6d in 1959. As a result of wage rises, consumer spending also increased by about 20% during this same period, while economic growth remained at about 3%. In addition, food rations were lifted in 1954 while hire-purchase controls were relaxed in the same year. As a result of these changes, large numbers of the working classes were able to participate in the consumer market for the first time.

As noted by Harriet Wilson,

The significant real wage increases in the 1950s and 1960s contributed to a rapid increase in working-class consumerism, with British consumer spending rising by 45% between 1952 and 1964. In addition, entitlement to various fringe benefits was improved. In 1955, 96% of manual labourers were entitled to two weeks' holiday with pay, compared with 61% in 1951. By the end of the 1950s, Britain had become one of the world's most affluent countries, and by the early Sixties, most Britons enjoyed a level of prosperity that had previously been known only to a small minority of the population. For the young and unattached, there was, for the first time in decades, spare cash for leisure, clothes, and luxuries. In 1959, Queen magazine declared that "Britain has launched into an age of unparalleled lavish living." Average wages were high while jobs were plentiful, and people saw their personal prosperity climb even higher. Prime Minister Harold Macmillan claimed that "the luxuries of the rich have become the necessities of the poor." Levels of disposable income rose steadily, with the spending power of the average family rising by 50% between 1951 and 1979, and by the end of the Seventies, 6 out of 10 families had come to own a car.

As noted by Martin Pugh,

By 1963, 82% of all private households had a television, 72% a vacuum cleaner, 45% a washing machine, and 30% a refrigerator. In addition, as noted by John Burnett,

A study of a slum area in Leeds (which was due for demolition) found that 74% of the households had a T.V., 41% a vacuum, and 38% a washing machine. In another slum area, St Mary's in Oldham (where in 1970 few of the houses had fixed baths or a hot water supply and half shared outside toilets), 67% of the houses were rated as comfortably furnished and a further 24% furnished luxuriously, with smart modern furniture, deep pile carpeting, and decorations.

The provision of household amenities steadily improved during the second half of the twentieth century. From 1971 to 1983, households having the sole use of a fixed bath or shower rose from 88% to 97%, and those with an internal WC from 87% to 97%. In addition, the number of households with central heating almost doubled during that same period, from 34% to 64%. By 1983, 94% of all households had a refrigerator, 81% a colour television, 80% a washing machine, 57% a deep freezer, and 28% a tumble-drier.

Between 1950 and 1970, however, Britain was overtaken by most of the countries of the European Common Market in terms of the number of telephones, refrigerators, television sets, cars, and washing machines per 100 of the population (although Britain remained high in terms of bathrooms and lavatories per 100 people). Although the British standard of living was increasing, the standard of living in other countries increased faster. According to a 1968 study by Anthony Sampson, British workers:

In 1976, UK wages were amongst the lowest in Western Europe, being half of West German rates and two-thirds of Italian rates. In addition, while educational opportunities for working-class people had widened significantly since the end of the Second World War, a number of developed countries came to overtake Britain in some educational indicators. By the early 1980s, some 80% to 90% of school leavers in France and West Germany received vocational training, compared with 40% in the United Kingdom. By the mid-1980s, over 80% of pupils in the United States and West Germany and over 90% in Japan stayed in education until the age of eighteen, compared with barely 33% of British pupils. In 1987, only 35% of 16- to 18-year-olds were in full-time education or training, compared with 80% in the United States, 77% in Japan, 69% in France, and 49% in the United Kingdom. There also remained gaps between manual and non-manual workers in areas such as fringe benefits and wage levels. In April 1978, for instance, male full-time manual workers aged 21 and above averaged a gross weekly wage of £80.70, while the equivalent for male white collar workers stood at £100.70.

Empire to Commonwealth

Britain's control over its Empire loosened during the interwar period. Nationalism strengthened in other parts of the empire, particularly in India and in Egypt.

Between 1867 and 1910, the UK had granted Australia, Canada, and New Zealand "Dominion" status (near complete autonomy within the Empire). They became charter members of the British Commonwealth of Nations (known as the Commonwealth of Nations since 1949), an informal but close-knit association that succeeded the British Empire. Beginning with the independence of India and Pakistan in 1947, the remainder of the British Empire was almost completely dismantled. Today, most of Britain's former colonies belong to the Commonwealth, almost all of them as independent members. There are, however, 13 former British colonies, including Bermuda, Gibraltar, the Falkland Islands, and others, which have elected to continue rule by London and are known as British Overseas Territories.

From the Troubles to the Belfast Agreement

In the 1960s, moderate unionist Prime Minister of Northern Ireland Terence O'Neill tried to reform the system and give a greater voice to Catholics who comprised 40% of the population of Northern Ireland. His goals were blocked by militant Protestants led by the Rev. Ian Paisley. The increasing pressures from nationalists for reform and from unionists to resist reform led to the appearance of the civil rights movement under figures like John Hume, Austin Currie and others. Clashes escalated out of control as the army could barely contain the Provisional Irish Republican Army (IRA) and the Ulster Defence Association. British leaders feared their withdrawal would give a "Doomsday Scenario", with widespread communal strife, followed by the mass exodus of hundreds of thousands of refugees. London shut down Northern Ireland's parliament and began direct rule. By the 1990s, the failure of the IRA campaign to win mass public support or achieve its aim of a British withdrawal led to negotiations that in 1998 produced the 'Good Friday Agreement'. It won popular support and largely ended the Troubles.

The economy in the late 20th century

After the relative prosperity of the 1950s and 1960s, the UK experienced extreme industrial strife and stagflation through the 1970s following a global economic downturn; Labour had returned to government in 1964 under Harold Wilson to end 13 years of Conservative rule. The Conservatives were restored to government in 1970 under Edward Heath, who failed to halt the country's economic decline and was ousted in 1974 as Labour returned to power under Harold Wilson. The economic crisis deepened following Wilson's return and things fared little better under his successor James Callaghan.

A strict modernisation of its economy began under the controversial Conservative leader Margaret Thatcher following her election as prime minister in 1979, which saw a time of record unemployment as deindustrialisation saw the end of much of the country's manufacturing industries, but also a time of economic boom as stock markets became liberalised and state-owned industries were privatised. Her rise to power was seen as the symbolic end of the time in which the British economy had become the "sick man" of western Europe.
Inflation also fell during this period and trade union power was reduced.

However the miners' strike of 1984–1985 sparked the end of most of the UK's coal mining. The exploitation of North Sea gas and oil brought in substantial tax and export revenues to aid the new economic boom. This was also the time that the IRA took the issue of Northern Ireland to Great Britain, maintaining a prolonged bombing campaign on the British mainland.

After the economic boom of the 1980s a brief but severe recession occurred between 1990 and 1992 following the economic chaos of Black Wednesday under government of John Major, who had succeeded Margaret Thatcher in 1990. However the rest of the 1990s saw the beginning of a period of continuous economic growth that lasted over 16 years and was greatly expanded under the New Labour government of Tony Blair following his landslide election victory in 1997, with a rejuvenated party having abandoned its commitment to policies including nuclear disarmament and nationalisation of key industries, and no reversal of the Thatcher-led union reforms.

From 1964 up until 1996, income per head had doubled, while ownership of various household goods had significantly increased. By 1996, two-thirds of households owned cars, 82% had central heating, most people owned a VCR, and one in five houses had a home computer. In 1971, 9% of households had no access to a shower or bathroom, compared with only 1% in 1990; largely due to demolition or modernisation of older properties which lacked such facilities. In 1971, only 35% had central heating, while 78% enjoyed this amenity in 1990. By 1990, 93% of households had colour television, 87% had telephones, 86% had washing machines, 80% had deep-freezers, 60% had video-recorders, and 47% had microwave ovens. Holiday entitlements had also become more generous. In 1990, nine out of ten full-time manual workers were entitled to more than four weeks of paid holiday a year, while twenty years previously only two-thirds had been allowed three weeks or more.

The postwar period also witnessed significant improvements in housing conditions. In 1960, 14% of British households had no inside toilet, while in 1967 22% of all homes had no basic hot water supply. By the 1990s, most homes had these amenities together with central heating. From 1996–1997 to 2006–2007, real median household income increased by 20% while real mean household incomes increased by 23%. There has also been a shift towards a service-based economy in the years following the end of the Second World War, with 11% of working people employed in manufacturing in 2006, compared with 25% in 1971.

Common Market (EEC), then EU, membership
Britain's wish to join the Common Market (as the European Economic Community was known in Britain) was first expressed in July 1961 by the Macmillan government. It was vetoed in 1963 by French President Charles de Gaulle. After initially hesitating over the issue, Harold Wilson's Labour Government lodged the UK's second application (in May 1967) to join the Community. Like the first, though, it was vetoed by de Gaulle.

In 1973, with DeGaulle gone, Conservative Prime Minister Heath negotiated terms for admission and Britain finally joined the Community. In opposition the Labour Party was deeply divided, though its Leader, Harold Wilson, remained in favour. In the 1974 General Election the Labour Party manifesto included a pledge to renegotiate terms for Britain's membership and then hold a referendum on whether to stay in the EC on the new terms. This was a constitutional procedure without precedent in British history. In the subsequent referendum campaign, rather than the normal British tradition of "collective responsibility", under which the government takes a policy position which all cabinet members are required to support publicly, members of the Government (and the Conservative opposition) were free to present their views on either side of the question. A referendum was duly held on 5 June 1975, and the proposition to continue membership was passed with a substantial majority.

The Single European Act (SEA) was the first major revision of the 1957 Treaty of Rome. In 1987, the Conservative government under Margaret Thatcher enacted it into UK law.

The Maastricht Treaty transformed the European Community into the European Union. In 1992, the Conservative government under John Major ratified it, against the opposition of his backbench Maastricht Rebels.

The Treaty of Lisbon introduced many changes to the treaties of the Union. Prominent changes included more qualified majority voting in the Council of Ministers, increased involvement of the European Parliament in the legislative process through extended codecision with the Council of Ministers, eliminating the pillar system and the creation of a President of the European Council with a term of two and a half years and a High Representative of the Union for Foreign Affairs and Security Policy to present a united position on EU policies. The Treaty of Lisbon will also make the Union's human rights charter, the Charter of Fundamental Rights, legally binding. The Lisbon Treaty also leads to an increase in the voting weight of the UK in the Council of the European Union from 8.4% to 12.4%. In July 2008, the Labour government under Gordon Brown approved the treaty and the Queen ratified it.

Devolution for Scotland and Wales

On 11 September 1997, (on the 700th anniversary of the Scottish victory over the English at the Battle of Stirling Bridge), a referendum was held on establishing a devolved Scottish Parliament. This resulted in an overwhelming 'yes' vote both to establishing the parliament and granting it limited tax varying powers. One week later, a referendum in Wales on establishing a Welsh Assembly was also approved but with a very narrow majority. The first elections were held, and these bodies began to operate in 1999. The creation of these bodies has widened the differences between the Countries of the United Kingdom, especially in areas like healthcare. It has also brought to the fore the so-called West Lothian question which is a complaint that devolution for Scotland and Wales but not England has created a situation where Scottish and Welsh MPs in the UK Parliament can, in principle, vote on internal matters affecting England alone whereas English MPs have no say in similar matters affecting Scotland and Wales.

21st century

War in Afghanistan and the Iraq War

In the 2001 General Election, the Labour Party won a second successive victory, though voter turnout dropped to the lowest level for more than 80 years. Later that year, the September 11th attacks in the United States led to American President George W. Bush launching the War on Terror, beginning with the invasion of Afghanistan aided by British troops in October 2001. Thereafter, with the US focus shifting to Iraq, Tony Blair convinced the Labour and Conservative MPs to vote in favour of supporting the 2003 invasion of Iraq, despite huge anti-war marches held in London and Glasgow. Forty-six thousand British troops, one-third of the total strength of the Army's land forces, were deployed to assist with the invasion of Iraq and thereafter British armed forces were responsible for security in southern Iraq. All British forces were withdrawn in 2010.

The Labour Party Prime Minister Tony Blair won the 2005 British general election and a third consecutive term. On 7 July 2005, a series of four suicide bombings struck London, killing 52 commuters along with the four bombers, and injuring hundreds of others.

Nationalist governments in Scotland
Following the 2007 Scottish Parliament election, the pro-independence Scottish National Party (SNP) won their first every victory. They formed a minority government with plans to hold a referendum before 2011 to seek a mandate "to negotiate with the Government of the United Kingdom to achieve independence for Scotland." Unionist parties responded by establishing the Calman Commission to examine further devolution of powers, a position that had the support of the Prime Minister. Responding to the findings of the review, the UK government issued a white paper in November 2009, on new powers that would be devolved to the Scottish Government, notably on how it can raise tax and carry out capital borrowing, and the running of Scottish Parliament elections. The proposal was criticised by the UK parliament opposition parties for not proposing to implement any changes before the next general election. Scottish Constitution Minister Michael Russell criticised the white paper, calling it "flimsy" and stating that their proposed Referendum (Scotland) Bill, 2010, whose own white paper was to be published five days later, would be "more substantial". According to The Independent, the Calman Review white paper proposals fall short of what would normally be seen as requiring a referendum. These proposals would ultimately form the basis of the Scotland Act 2012.

The 2011 election saw a decisive victory for the SNP which was able to form a majority government intent on delivering a referendum on independence. Within hours of the victory, Prime Minister David Cameron guaranteed that the UK government would not put any legal or political obstacles in the way of such a referendum.

2014 Scottish Independence referendum 

On 18 September 2014, a referendum was held in Scotland on whether to leave the United Kingdom and become an independent country. The three UK-wide political parties—Labour, Conservative and Liberal Democrats—campaigned together as part of the Better Together campaign while the pro-independence Scottish National Party was the main force in the Yes Scotland campaign, together with the Scottish Green Party and the Scottish Socialist Party. Days before the vote, with the opinion polls closing, the three Better Together party leaders issued 'The Vow', a promise of more powers for Scotland in the event of a No vote. The referendum resulted in Scotland voting by 55% to 45% to remain part of the United Kingdom.

First minister Alex Salmond resigned shortly after the defeat, succeeded by Nicola Sturgeon. Advocating for a second referendum, she would lead the SNP to victory in the 2016 and 2021 elections.

The 2008 economic crisis

In the wake of the global economic crisis of 2008, the United Kingdom economy contracted, experiencing negative economic growth throughout 2009. The announcement in November 2008 that the economy had shrunk for the first time since late 1992 brought an end to 16 years of continuous economic growth. Causes included an end to the easy credit of the preceding years, reduction in consumption and substantial depreciation of sterling (which fell 25% against the euro between January 2008 and January 2009), leading to increased import costs, notably of oil.

On 8 October 2008, the British Government announced a bank rescue package of around £500 billion ($850 billion at the time). The plan comprised three parts.: £200 billion to be made available to the banks in the Bank of England's Special Liquidity Scheme; the Government was to increase the banks' market capitalization, through the Bank Recapitalization Fund, with an initial £25 billion and another £25 billion to be provided if needed; and the Government was to temporarily underwrite any eligible lending between British banks up to around £250 billion. With the UK officially coming out of recession in the fourth quarter of 2009—ending six consecutive quarters of economic decline—the Bank of England decided against further quantitative easing.

The 2010 coalition government
The United Kingdom General Election of 6 May 2010 resulted in the first hung parliament since 1974, with the Conservative Party winning the largest number of seats, but falling short of the 326 seats required for an overall majority. Following this, the Conservatives and the Liberal Democrats agreed to form the first coalition government for the UK since the end of the Second World War, with David Cameron becoming Prime Minister and Nick Clegg Deputy Prime Minister.

Under the coalition government, British military aircraft participated in the UN-mandated intervention in the 2011 Libyan civil war, flying a total of 3,000 air sorties against forces loyal to the Libyan dictator Muammar Gaddafi between March and October 2011. 2011 also saw England suffer unprecedented rioting in its major cities in early August, killing five people and causing over £200 million worth of property damage.

In late October 2011, the prime ministers of the Commonwealth realms voted to grant gender equality in the royal succession, ending the male-preference primogeniture that was mandated by the Act of Settlement 1701. The amendment, once enacted, will also end the ban on the monarch marrying a Catholic.

2015 election
The 2015 election was held on 7 May 2015 with pre-election polls all predicting a close race and a hung parliament. The surprising result on the night was a clear victory by the Conservative Party: with 37% of the popular vote, they won a narrow overall majority in parliament with 331 of the 650 seats.

The other most significant result of the election was the Scottish National Party winning all but three of the 59 seats in Scotland, a gain of 50. This had been widely forecast as opinion polls had recorded a surge in support for the SNP following the 2014 independence referendum, and SNP party membership had more than quadrupled from 25,000 to over 100,000, meaning that 1 in every 50 of the population of Scotland was a party member.

Labour suffered its worst defeat since 1987, taking only 31% of the votes and losing 40 of its 41 seats in Scotland. The Liberal Democrats lost 49 of their 57 seats, as they were punished for their decision to form a coalition with the conservatives in 2010. The UK Independence Party (UKIP), rallying voters against the European Union and against uncontrolled immigration, secured 13% of the vote and came second in over 115 races, but won only one seat in parliament. Cameron had a mandate for his austerity policies to shrink the size of government, and a challenge in dealing with Scotland. Likewise the Green Party of England and Wales saw a rise in support but retained just its one seat.

2016 EU referendum

On 20 February 2016, British Prime Minister David Cameron announced that a referendum on the UK's membership of the European Union would be held on 23 June 2016, following years of campaigning by eurosceptics. Debates and campaigns by parties supporting both "Remain" (Britain Stronger in Europe)and "Leave" (Vote Leave) focused on concerns regarding trade and the European Single Market, security, migration and sovereignty. The result of the referendum was in favour of the country leaving the EU with 51.9% of voters wanting to leave. David Cameron resigned from Parliament on 13 July, which led to Theresa May succeeding him as Prime Minister.

The UK remained a member of the EU for the time being, but invoked Article 50 of the Lisbon Treaty on 29 March 2017. This started negotiations on a withdrawal agreement that will last no more than two years (unless the Council and the UK agree to extend the negotiation period), before an exit from the European Union (Brexit) intended on 29 March 2019 but later extended to currently 31 October 2019. The longer-term implications of the referendum vote remain uncertain, with politicians and commentators suggesting various outcomes.

The debate on Brexit grew heated. During the 2016 campaign on the referendum, Boris Johnson became a leading proponent of Vote Leave, stating, "The EU is, I'm afraid a job-destroying engine. You can see it all across southern Europe, you can see it, alas, in our country". A victory for Brexit, he argued, would be "independence day" for Britain if it leaves the European Union. By 2019, Johnson was Prime Minister and pushed hard for an exit on 31 October 2019. The opponents warned of bedlam. Political commentator Jonathan Freedland argued in late summer 2019 that the Britain of 2019 is, "in the grip of a populism that is trampling on the norms and constraints of liberal democracy, that is contemplating a collective act of self-harm without precedent, that is bracing itself for disruption, shortages, even civil unrest unknown in peacetime. This is not the consequence of unavoidable war or an unforeseen natural disaster, but is entirely of the country's own making."

COVID-19 pandemic

Though later reporting indicated that there may have been some cases dating from late 2019, COVID-19 was confirmed to be spreading in the UK by the end of January 2020 with the first confirmed deaths in March. The country was initially relatively slow in implementing restrictions. Subsequent epidemiological analysis showed that over 1000 lineages of SARS-CoV-2 entered the UK in early 2020 from international travellers, mostly from outbreaks elsewhere in Europe, leading to numerous clusters that overwhelmed contact tracing efforts. A legally enforced Stay at Home Order, or lockdown, was introduced on 23 March. Restrictions were steadily eased across the UK in late spring and early summer that year. The UK's epidemic in early 2020 was at the time one of the largest and deadliest worldwide.

By the Autumn, COVID-19 cases were again rising. This led to the creation of new regulations along with the introduction of the concept of a local lockdown, a variance in restrictions in a more specific geographic location than the four nations of the UK. Lockdowns took place in Wales, England and Northern Ireland later that season. A new variant of the virus is thought to have originated in Kent around September 2020. Once restrictions were lifted, the novel variant rapidly spread across the UK. Its increased transmissibility contributed to a continued increase in daily infections. The NHS had come under severe strain by late December. This led to a tightening of restrictions across the UK.

The first COVID-19 vaccine was approved and began its rollout in the UK in early December, 15 million vaccine doses had been given to predominantly those most vulnerable to the virus by mid-February. 6 months later more than 75% of adults in the UK were fully vaccinated against COVID-19. Restrictions began to ease from late February onwards and almost all had ended in Great Britain by August. A third wave of daily infections began in July 2021 due to the arrival and rapid spread of the highly transmissible SARS-CoV-2 Delta variant. However, mass vaccination continued to keep deaths and hospitalisations at much lower levels than in previous waves. During the ongoing third COVID wave, in the light of highly transmissible Omicron variant, the U.K. was also the acclaim of a new hybrid strain, Deltacron variant, which pre-dominates the country until April 2022 as ahead of endemic phase alongside Ireland, Finland, Cyprus, Slovenia, Croatia, and among others.

2022 Government Crises

Partygate 

Starting in November 2021, a political scandal emerged about parties and other gatherings of government and Conservative Party staff held during the COVID-19 pandemic in 2020 and 2021, when public health restrictions prohibited most gatherings. While several lockdowns in the country were in place, gatherings took place at 10 Downing Street, its garden, and other government buildings. Reports of events attracted media attention, public backlash and political controversy. In late January 2022, twelve gatherings came under investigation by the Metropolitan Police, including at least three attended by Boris Johnson, the Prime Minister. The police issued 126 fixed penalty notices (FPNs) to 83 individuals whom the police found had committed offences under COVID-19 regulations, including one each to Johnson, his wife Carrie Johnson, and Rishi Sunak, the Chancellor of the Exchequer, who all apologised and paid the penalties. The scandal damaged Johnson with various polls throughout late 2021 and early 2022 suggested that a majority of voters wanted Johnson to resign as Prime Minister over the controversy. After Johnson apologised for the 20 May 2020 gathering, one poll indicated that 68% of the public considered his apology not to have been sincere. 

By 14 January 2022, YouGov polling found that 72% of the British public held an unfavourable view of Johnson, a record low for his tenure and surpassing the lowest popularity of Theresa May during her premiership. Following the reporting of further gatherings in January 2022, the Conservatives fell further in the polls, with Labour having a lead of around 10 points. Polling by Ipsos MORI in January 2022 found that "lack of faith in politicians and politics" was cited as a major problem facing the country by 25% of the public, the highest recorded since 2016 and "likely related" to the revelations of lockdown parties.

July 2022 United Kingdom Government Crisis 

During 2022 more scandals emerged, and in early July 2022, 62 of the United Kingdom's 179 government ministers, parliamentary private secretaries, trade envoys, and party vice-chairmen resigned from their positions in the second Johnson ministry.  And what was considered the "last straw" for the Prime Minister was the Chris Pincher scandal, the scandal arose after it was revealed that Johnson had promoted his Deputy Chief Government Whip Chris Pincher, who was publicly facing multiple allegations of sexual assault, to the position despite knowing of the allegations beforehand. And on the 7 July, Boris Johnson's resigned.  Foreign Secretary Liz Truss was elected as his successor to the Conservative Party leadership on the 5 September defeating former Chancellor Rishi Sunak with 81,326 (57.4%) against Sunak's 60,399 (42.6%).

October 2022 United Kingdom Government Crisis 

Liz Truss's premiership would be short lived, as in September and October 2022, Liz Truss and her Conservative government faced a credibility crisis. The crisis began following the September 2022 United Kingdom mini-budget, which was received negatively by the world financial markets. It ultimately led to the dismissal of the chancellor of the Exchequer, Kwasi Kwarteng, on 14 October, and his replacement by Jeremy Hunt. In the following days Truss came under increasing pressure to reverse further elements of the mini-budget to satisfy the markets, and five Conservative members of parliament had called for her resignation by 17 October.

On 19 October Suella Braverman, the home secretary, resigned over a technical breach of the Ministerial Code following a disagreement with Truss over immigration reform. Braverman's resignation letter was highly critical of Truss. That evening MPs voted on a Labour Party motion to create time to debate a ban on fracking in the United Kingdom, which was opposed by the government. The vote caused confusion among Conservative MPs, who were not clear whether or not it was being treated as a confidence vote. The confusion was compounded by speculation that the Chief Whip and Deputy Chief Whip had resigned, and by allegations that some Conservative MPs had been manhandled in the voting lobby.

On 20 October, Truss resigned but stated she would remain in office until the Conservative Party had chosen her successor. Truss was in office for 50 days before her resignation, and her departure made her term the shortest overall of any prime minister in UK history, beating George Canning who died in office after 119 days. The resulting leadership election had two candidates: Rishi Sunak and Leader of the House of Commons Penny Mordaunt who ran against Truss and Sunak in the previous leadership election. There was speculation that former Prime Minister Boris Johnson would run, however on 23 October, he announced he was not participating in the election. On 24 October, minutes before the result was announced, Mordaunt announced her withdrawal from the election, leaving Sunak as the sole candidate. He was appointed prime minister on 25 October.

See also

Notes

References

Further reading

 , short scholarly biographies of all the major people
 
  University textbook
 
 
 
 
 
 
 Broadberry, Stephen et al. British Economic Growth, 1270–1870 (2015)
 Review by Jeffrey G. Williamson online
 Brown, David, Robert Crowcroft, and Gordon Pentland, eds. The Oxford Handbook of Modern British Political History, 1800–2000 (2018)
  historical encyclopedia; 4000 entries
 Childs, David. Britain since 1945: A Political History (2012)
 
 Cook, Chris. The Longman Companion to Britain in the Nineteenth Century 1815–1914 (1999)
 Cook, Chris and John Stevenson, eds. Longman Companion to Britain Since 1945 (1995)
 Colley, Linda. Britons: Forging the Nation, 1707–1837 (Yale University Press 1992)
 Daunton, M. J. Progress and Poverty: An Economic and Social History of Britain 1700–1850 (1995); Wealth and Welfare: An Economic and Social History of Britain 1851–1951 (2007)
 
 The Encyclopedia of Britain (Helicon, 1999) ; also published as Hutchinson Encyclopedia of Britain
 Floud, Roderick, and Donald McCloskey, eds. The Economic History of Britain since 1700 (1st ed. 1981; 2nd edition 1994).
 Floud, Roderick, Jane Humphries, and Paul Johnson, eds. The Cambridge Economic History of Modern Britain (2014); advanced economic history, heavy on econometrics and statistics;
 Gardiner, Juliet. Wartime: Britain 1939–1945 (2004); social history
 Gilley, Sheridan, and W. J. Sheils. A History of Religion in Britain: Practice and Belief from Pre-Roman Times to the Present (1994)
 Gregg, Pauline. A Social and Economic History of Britain: 1760–1950 (1950) online
 Harrison, Brian. Seeking a Role: The United Kingdom, 1951–1970 (New Oxford History of England) (2011); online
 Harrison, Brian. Finding a Role?: The United Kingdom 1970–1990 (New Oxford History of England) (2011); online
 Hastings, Adrian. A History of English Christianity: 1920–1985 (1986)
 Havighurst, Alfred F. Modern England, 1901–1984 (2nd ed. 1987) online free to borrow
  synthesis
 Holland, R. F. The pursuit of greatness: Britain and the world role, 1900–1970 (Fontana history of England) (1991)
 
 
 Hylson-Smith, Kenneth. The churches in England from Elizabeth I to Elizabeth II (1996).
 Jones, J. R. Britain and the World, 1649–1815 (1980); emphasizing rivalry with France
 Kearney, Hugh. The British Isles: a history of four nations (Cambridge University Press, 1989)
 Langford, Paul. A Polite and Commercial People: England 1727–1783 (New Oxford History of England) (1994)
 Leventhal, F. M. Twentieth-Century Britain: An Encyclopedia (2nd ed. 2002); short articles by scholars
 Lunn, Jon, Vaughne Miller, Ben Smith. "British foreign policy since 1997 – Commons Library Research Paper RP08/56" (UK House of Commons, 2008) online
  university textbook
 Marr, Andrew. A History of Modern Britain (2009); also published as The Making of Modern Britain (2010), popular history covers 1945–2005
 Marshall, Dorothy. Eighteenth-Century England (2nd ed. 1974), political and diplomatic history 1714–1784
 Marshall, Dorothy. English People in the Eighteenth Century (1956), social and economic history
 
 
 Mokyr, Joel. The Enlightened Economy: An Economic History of Britain 1700–1850 (2010)
 Morgan, Kenneth O. The Oxford History of Britain (2010)
 
  online review
 O'Gorman, Frank. The Long Eighteenth Century: British Political and Social History 1688–1832 (1997)
 Owen, John B. The Eighteenth Century: 1714–1815 (1976)
 Otte, T. G. The Makers of British Foreign Policy: From Pitt to Thatcher (2002)
 Pearce, Malcolm, and Geoffrey Stewart. British political history, 1867–2001: democracy and decline (Routledge, 2013).
 Plumb, J. H. England in the Eighteenth Century (1950)
 Pollard, Sidney. The Development of the British Economy, 1914–1990 (4th ed. 1991).
 Pugh, Martin. Speak for Britain!: A New History of the Labour Party (2011)
 Ramsden, John, ed. The Oxford Companion to Twentieth-Century British Politics (2005)
 Reynolds, David.  Britannia Overruled: British Policy and World Power in the Twentieth Century (2nd ed. 2000)
  university textbook
 Royle, Edward. Modern Britain: A Social History 1750–2010 (2012)
 Rule, John. Albion's People: English Society 1714–1815 (1992)
 Searle, G. R. A New England?: Peace and War 1886–1918 (New Oxford History of England) (2005)
 Schama, Simon. A History of Britain, Vol. 2: The Wars of the British, 1603–1776 (2001); A History of Britain: The Fate of Empire 1776–2000 (2002)
 Simms, Brendan. Three Victories and a Defeat: The Rise and Fall of the First British Empire, 1714–1783 (2008). online
 Somervell, D. C. The Reign of King George V, (1936); wide-ranging political, social and economic coverage, 1910–35; online free
 
 Thomson, David. England in the 19th Century 1815–1914 (1951) online
 
 
 Ward, A. W. and G. P. Gooch, eds. The Cambridge History of British Foreign Policy, 1783–1919 (1921–1923); vol 1, 1783–1815; vol 2, 1815–1866; vol 3. 1866–1919
 Webb, R. K. Modern England: from the 18th century to the present (1968) online
 Welsh, Frank. The Four nations: a history of the United Kingdom (Yale University Press, 2003)
 Willson, David Harris. A history of England (4th ed. 1991) online 1972 edition, university textbook

Historiography

 
  brief university textbook
  essays by 38 experts;
  annotated guide to 1000 history books on every major topic, plus book reviews and articles
 
 
 
 
 
  33 topical essays

Primary sources

 English historical documents London: Methuen; 12 vol covering Middle Ages to 1957; reprinted 2011; the most comprehensive collection on political, constitutional, economic and social topics
 Beard, Charles, ed. An introduction to the English historians (1906) excerpts
 Cheyney, Edward P.  Readings in English History Drawn from the Original Sources Intended to Illustrate a Short History of England (1935), 850 pp, strongest on political & constitutional topics
 Stephenson, Carl and Frederick G. Marcham, eds. Sources of English Constitutional History (2nd ed. 1990)
 Weiner, Joel H. ed. Great Britain Foreign Policy & Span of Empire, 1689–1971 (1983)
 Wiener, Joel H. ed. Great Britain: the lion at home; a documentary history of domestic policy, 1689–1973 (4 vol 1974), 1396 pp
 "Finding primary resources for modern British history"

External links
 
 Contemporary British History
 First World War Studies 
 Twentieth Century British History
 History of Education: Journal of the History of Education Society
 Timelines: Sources from history – British Library interactive
 Info Britain.co.uk
 History of the United Kingdom: Primary Documents
 British History online
 Text of 1800 Act of Union
 Act of Union virtual library 
 Vision of Britain